There are about 4,200 known moth species of Turkey. The moths (mostly nocturnal) and butterflies (mostly diurnal) together make up the taxonomic order Lepidoptera.

This is a list of moth species which have been recorded in Turkey.

Micropterigidae
Microptericina amasiella Staudinger, 1880
Micropterix allionella (Fabricius, 1794)
Micropterix aruncella Scopoli, 1763
Micropterix klimeschi Heath, 1973
Micropterix maschukella Alphéraky, 1870
Micropterix paykullella Akermann, 1792
Micropterix schaefferi Heath, 1975
Micropterix wockei Staudinger, 1870

Eriocraniidae
Dyseriocrania subpurpurella Haworth, 1828

Hepialidae
Hepialus humuli (Linnaeus, 1758)
Korscheltellus lupulinus (Linnaeus, 1758)
Triodia amasina Herrich-Schäffer, 1851
Triodia sylvina (Linnaeus, 1761)
Zenophassus schamyl Christoph, 1888

Nepticulidae
Ectoedemia caradjai Hering, 1932
Ectoedemia terebinthivora Klimesch, 1975
Etainia sericopeza Zeller, 1839
Fomoria louisae Klimesch, 1978
Glaucolepis albiflorella Klimesch, 1978
Stigmella aceris Frey, 1857
Stigmella azaroli Klimesch, 1978
Stigmella basiguttella Heinemann, 1862
Stigmella centifoliella Zeller, 1848
Stigmella fagella Heinemann, 1862
Stigmella mespilicola Frey, 1856
Stigmella minusculella Herrich-Schäffer, [1855]
Stigmella muricatella Klimesch, 1978
Stigmella paliurella Gerasimov, 1937
Stigmella prunetorum Stainton, 1855
Stigmella pyrellicola Klimesch, 1978
Stigmella rhamnophila Amsel, 1935
Stigmella samiatella Zeller, 1839
Trifurcula eurema Tutt, 1899
Trifurcula pallidella Zeller, 1845

Opostegidae
Opostega auritella (Hübner, [1813])
Opostega crepusculella Zeller, 1839
Opostega salaciella Treitschke, 1833
Opostega spatulella Herrich-Schäffer, [1855]

Tischeriidae
Tischeria angusticollella Duponchel, 1843
Tischeria ekebladella Bjerkander, 1795
Tischeria gaunacella Duponchel, 1843
Tischeria marginea Haworth, 1828

Heliozelidae
Antispila pfeifferella (Hübner, [1813])

Incurvariidae
Alloclemensia devotella Rebel, 1893
Incurvaria masculella ([Denis & Schiffermüller], 1775)

Prodoxidae
Lampronia koerneriella Zeller, 1839
Lampronia rubiella Bjerkander, 1781
Lampronia rupella ([Denis & Schiffermüller], 1775)

Adelidae
Adela anatolica Rebel, 1902
Adela annae Zeller, 1853
Adela auricella Ragonot, 1874
Adela barbatella Zeller, 1847
Adela chlorista Meyrick, 1912
Adela croesella Scopoli, 1763
Adela dumerilella Duponchel, 1838
Adela fasciella (Fabricius, 1775)
Adela fibulella ([Denis & Schiffermüller], 1775)
Adela florella Staudinger, 1870
Adela istrianella Heydenreich, 1851
Adela leucocerella Scopoli, 1763
Adela mazzolella (Hübner, [1801])
Adela metallica (Poda, 1761)
Adela mollella (Hübner, [1816])
Adela prodigella Mann, 1853
Adela raddella (Hübner, 1793)
Adela reaumurella (Linnaeus, 1758)
Adela repetitella Mann, 1861
Adela rufifrontella Treitschke, 1833
Adela rufimitrella Scopoli, 1763
Adela tridesma Meyrick, 1912
Nematopogon panzerella (Fabricius, 1794)
Nematopogon pilella ([Denis & Schiffermüller], 1775)
Nematopogon robertella Clerck, 1759
Nematopogon schwarziella Zeller, 1839
Nematopogon swammerdammella (Linnaeus, 1758)

Deuterotineidae
Deuterotinea casanella Eversmann, 1844
Deuterotinea palaestinensis Rebel, 1901
Deuterotinea paradoxella Staudinger, 1859
Deuterotinea syriaca Lederer, 1857

Psychidae
Acanthopsyche atra (Linnaeus, 1767)
Anaproutia reticulatella Bruand, 1853
Apterona helicoidella Vallot, 1827
Bankesia pallida Staudinger, 1879
Bijugis pectinella ([Denis & Schiffermüller], 1775)
Dahlica triquetrella (Hübner, [1813])
Diplodoma laichartingella Goeze, 1783
Dissoctena granigerella Staudinger, 1859
Eochorica balcanica Rebel, 1919
Eumasia parietariella Heydenreich, 1851
Lepidopsyche unicolor (Hufnagel, 1766)
Masonia rassei Sieder, 1975
Megalophanes viciella ([Denis & Schiffermüller], 1775)
Melasina ciliaris Ochsenheimer, 1810
Melasina punctatella Bruand, 1853
Oiketicoides caucasica Bang-Haas, 1921
Oiketicoides febretta Boyer, 1835
Oiketicoides lutea Staudinger, 1871
Oiketicoides senex Staudinger, 1871
Oiketicoides taurica Wehrli, 1932
Pachytelia villosella Ochsenheimer, 1810
Penestoglossa tauricella Rebel, 1935
Phalacropterix bruandi Lederer, 1855
Psyche casta Pallas, 1767
Psyche crassiorella Bruand, [1851]
Ptilocephala mediterranea Lederer, 1853
Ptilocephala plumifera Ochsenheimer, 1810
Rebelia surientella Bruand, 1858
Reisseronia flavociliella Mann, 1864
Taleporia pseudoimprovisella Freina & Witt, 1984
Taleporia tubulosa Retzius, 1783

Eriocottidae
Eriocottis fuscanella Zeller, 1847

Tineidae
Anemallota praetoriella Christoph, 1872
Anemapogon quercicolella Herrich-Schäffer, [1851]
Ateliotum cypellias Meyrick, 1937
Ateliotum hungaricellum Zeller, 1839
Ateliotum syriacum Caradja, 1920
Cephimallota angusticostella Zeller, 1839
Cephimallota crassiflavella Bruand, 1851
Cephimallota libanotica Petersen, 1959
Cephimallota tunesiella Zagulyaev, 1966
Ceratuncus affinitellus Rebel, 1901
Ceratuncus danubiellus Mann, 1866
Crassicornella crassicornella Zeller, 1847
Edosa ditella Pierce & Diakonoff, 1938
Edosa fuscoviolacella Ragonot, 1895
Edosa lardatella Lederer, 1858
Eudarcia forsteri Petersen, 1964
Euplocamus anthracinalis Scopoli, 1763
Euplocamus delagrangei Ragonot, 1895
Euplocamus ophisus Cramer, [1779]
Fermocelina inquinatella Zeller, 1852
Fermocelina latiusculella Stainton, 1867
Haplotinea ditella Pierce & Diakonoff, 1938
Haplotinea insectella (Fabricius, 1794)
Hapsifera luridella Zeller, 1847
Hapsifera multiguttella Ragonot, 1895
Infurcitinea albicomella Stainton, 1851
Infurcitinea anatolica Petersen, 1968
Infurcitinea nedae Gaedike, 1983
Infurcitinea nigropluviella Walsingham, 1907
Infurcitinea rumelicella Rebel, 1903
Infurcitinea tauridella Petersen, 1968
Infurcitinea turcica Petersen, 1968
Lichenotinea pustulatella Zeller, 1852
Monopis imella (Hübner, [1813])
Monopis laevigella ([Denis & Schiffermüller], 1775)
Monopis meleodes Meyrick, 1917
Monopis ustella Haworth, 1828
Morophaga choragella ([Denis & Schiffermüller], 1775)
Morophaga morella Duponchel, 1838
Morophagoides orientalis Petersen,
Myrmecozela lutosella Eversmann, 1844
Nemapogon anatolica Gaedike, 1986
Nemapogon arenbergeri Gaedike, 1986
Nemapogon cloacella Haworth, 1828
Nemapogon gliriella Heyden, 1865
Nemapogon granella (Linnaeus, 1758)
Nemapogon gravosaella Petersen, 1957
Nemapogon hungarica Gozmany, 1960
Nemapogon inconditella Lucas, 1956
Nemapogon kasyi Gaedike, 1986
Nemapogon levantina Petersen, 1961
Nemapogon orientalis Petersen, 1961
Nemapogon ruricolella Stainton, 1849
Nemapogon signatella Petersen, 1957
Nemapogon teberdellus Zagulyaev, 1963
Nemapogon variatella Clemens, 1859
Nemapogon vartianae Gaedike, 1986
Neomeessia gracilis Petersen, 1968
Neurothaumasia ankerella Mann, 1867
Niditinea fuscipunctella Haworth, 1828
Novotinea fasciata Staudinger, 1879
Opogona panchalcella Staudinger, 1871
Paratinea merdella Zeller, 1847
Perissomastix wiltshirella Petersen, 1964
Reisserita relicinella Herrich-Schäffer, [1851]
Rhodobates laevigatellus Herrich-Schäffer, [1854]
Rhodobates pallipalpellus Rebel, 1901
Tinea basifasciella Ragonot, 1895
Tinea flavescentella Haworth, 1828
Tinea murariella Staudinger, 1859
Tinea pellionella Linnaeus, 1758
Triaxomera fulvimitrella Sodoffsky, 1830
Triaxomera parasitella (Hübner, 1796)
Trichophaga bipartitella Ragonot, 1892
Trichophaga tapetzella (Linnaeus, 1758)

Bucculatricidae
Bucculatrix albedinella Zeller, 1839
Bucculatrix anthemidella Deschka, 1972
Bucculatrix basifuscella Staudinger, 1880
Bucculatrix crataegi Zeller, 1839
Bucculatrix infans Staudinger, 1880
Bucculatrix nigricomella Zeller, 1839
Bucculatrix oppositella Staudinger, 1880
Bucculatrix pseudosylvella Rebel, 1941
Bucculatrix ulmella Zeller, 1848

Douglasiidae
Klimeschia cinereipunctella Turati & Fiori, 1930
Klimeschia transversella Zeller, 1839
Klimeschia vibratoriella Mann, 1862
Tinagma anchusellum Benander, 1936
Tinagma columbellum Staudinger, 1880
Tinagma minutissimum Staudinger, 1880
Tinagma ocnerostomellum Stainton, 1850

Gracillariidae
Acrocercops brongniardella (Fabricius, 1798)
Aspilapteryx tringipennella Zeller, 1839
Callisto denticulella Thunberg, 1794
Caloptilia alchimilella Scopoli, 1763
Caloptilia braccatella Staudinger, 1870
Caloptilia coruscans Walsingham, 1907
Caloptilia cuculipennella (Hübner, 1796)
Caloptilia elongella (Linnaeus, 1761)
Caloptilia fidella Reutti, 1853
Caloptilia fribergensis Fritzsche, 1871
Caloptilia hemidactylella ([Denis & Schiffermüller], 1775)
Caloptilia mutilata Staudinger, 1879
Caloptilia onustella (Hübner, [1813])
Caloptilia pallescens Staudinger, 1879
Caloptilia rhodinella Herrich-Schäffer, [1854]
Caloptilia roscipennella (Hübner, 1796)
Caloptilia stigmatella (Fabricius, 1781)
Calybites auroguttella Stephens, 1835
Calybites quadrisignella Zeller, 1839
Cupedia cupediella Herrich-Schäffer, 1855
Dialectica imperialella Mann, 1847
Dialectica scalariella Zeller, 1850
Gracillaria syringella (Fabricius, 1794)
Micrurapteryx kollariella Zeller, 1839
Parornix anglicella Stainton, 1850
Parornix anguliferella Zeller, 1847
Parornix devoniella Stainton, 1850
Parornix finitimella Zeller, 1850
Parornix oculata (Triberti, 1979)
Parornix torquillella Zeller, 1850
Phyllocnistis unipunctella Stephens, 1834
Phyllonorycter abrasella Duponchel, 1843
Phyllonorycter acaciella Duponchel, [1843]
Phyllonorycter acerifoliella Zeller, 1839
Phyllonorycter anatolica Deschka, 1970
Phyllonorycter belotella Staudinger, 1859
Phyllonorycter cerasicolella Herrich-Schäffer, 1855
Phyllonorycter corylifoliella (Hübner, 1796)
Phyllonorycter deleta Staudinger, 1880
Phyllonorycter emberizaepennella Bouché, 1834
Phyllonorycter flava Deschka, 1975
Phyllonorycter fraxinella Zeller, 1846
Phyllonorycter gerasimovi Hering, 1930
Phyllonorycter harrisella (Linnaeus, 1761)
Phyllonorycter helianthemella Herrich-Schäffer, 1861
Phyllonorycter klemannella (Fabricius, 1781)
Phyllonorycter kusdasi Deschka, 1970
Phyllonorycter lautella Zeller, 1846
Phyllonorycter maestingella (Müller, 1764)
Phyllonorycter mannii Zeller, 1846
Phyllonorycter messaniella Zeller, 1846
Phyllonorycter millierella Staudinger, 1870
Phyllonorycter muelleriella Zeller, 1839
Phyllonorycter nivalis Deschka, 1986
Phyllonorycter oxyacanthae Frey, 1856
Phyllonorycter platani Staudinger, 1871
Phyllonorycter pyrispinosae Deschka, 1986
Phyllonorycter quercifoliella Zeller, 1839
Phyllonorycter quinnata Geoffroy, 1785
Phyllonorycter roboris Zeller, 1849
Phyllonorycter saportella Duponchel, [1840]
Phyllonorycter schreberella (Fabricius, 1781)
Phyllonorycter trifasciella Haworth, 1828
Polymitia eximipalpella Gerasimov, 1930
Povolnya leucopennella Stephens, 1835
Sabulopteryx inquinata Triberti, 1985
Sabulopteryx limosella Duponchel, 1843
Sauterina hofmanniella Schleich, 1867
Spulerina simploniella F.R., [1840]

Roeslerstammiidae
Roeslerstammia pronubella ([Denis & Schiffermüller], 1775)

Pterolonchidae
Pterolonche albescens Zeller, 1847
Pterolonche inspersa Staudinger, 1859
Pterolonche pulverulenta Zeller, 1847

Agonoxenidae
Chrysoclista linneella (Linnaeus, 1761)
Spuleria flavicaput Haworth, 1828

Batrachedridae
Batrachedra ledereriella Zeller, 1850

Blastobasidae
Blastobasis phycidella Zeller, 1839
Holcocera inunctella Zeller, 1839

Coleophoridae
About 187 species - see: List of moths of Turkey (Coleophoridae)

Elachistidae
Elachista adscitella Stainton, 1851
Elachista albifrontella (Hübner, [1817])
Elachista anatoliensis Traugott-Olsen, 1990
Elachista anserinella Zeller, 1839
Elachista argentella Clerck, 1759
Elachista atrisquamosa Staudinger, 1880
Elachista blancella Traugott-Olsen, 1992
Elachista chionella Mann, 1861
Elachista chrysodesmella Zeller, 1850
Elachista cingillella Herrich-Schäffer, [1855]
Elachista collitella Duponchel, [1843]
Elachista contaminatella Zeller, 1847
Elachista deceptricula Staudinger, 1880
Elachista deresyensis Traugott-Olsen, 1988
Elachista disertella Herrich-Schäffer, [1855]
Elachista dispilella Zeller, 1839
Elachista dispositella Frey, 1859
Elachista festucicolella Zeller, 1853
Elachista flavescens Parenti, 1981
Elachista gangabella Zeller, 1850
Elachista gebzeensis Traugott-Olsen, 1990
Elachista gleichenella (Fabricius, 1781)
Elachista griseella Zeller, 1850
Elachista grotenfelti Kaila, 2012
Elachista incanella Herrich-Schäffer, [1855]
Elachista kleini Amsel, 1935
Elachista maculata Parenti, 1978
Elachista melancholica Frey, 1859
Elachista minusculella Traugott-Olsen, 1992
Elachista monosemiella Roesler, 1881
Elachista nuraghella Amsel, 1935
Elachista pollinariella Zeller, 1839
Elachista pollutella Herrich-Schäffer, [1855]
Elachista pollutissima Staudinger, 1880
Elachista revinctella Zeller, 1850
Elachista rudectella Stainton, 1851
Elachista rufocinerea Haworth, 1828
Elachista turkensis Traugott-Olsen, 1990
Elachista unifasciella Haworth, 1828
Elachista vegliae Parenti, 1978
Elachista zonariella Tensgtröm, 1847
Perittia echiella de Joannis, 1902
Perittia huemeri (Traugott-Olsen, 1990)
Perittia junnilaisella Kaila, 2009
Perittia karadaghella Sinev & Budashkin, 1991
Perittia ravida Kaila, 2009
Stephensia abbreviatella Stainton, 1851
Stephensia brunnichiella (Linnaeus, 1767)

Oecophoridae
Agonopterix adspersella Kollar, 1832
Agonopterix alstroemeriana Clerck, 1759
Agonopterix assimilella Treitschke, 1832
Agonopterix atomella ([Denis & Schiffermüller], 1775)
Agonopterix capreolella Zeller, 1839
Agonopterix cnicella Treitschke, 1832
Agonopterix comitella Lederer, 1855
Agonopterix despoliatella Erschoff, 1874
Agonopterix epicachritis Ragonot, 1895
Agonopterix flavella (Hübner, 1796)
Agonopterix furvella Treitschke, 1832
Agonopterix imbutella Christoph, 1888
Agonopterix kaekeritziana (Linnaeus, 1767)
Agonopterix latipennella Zerny, 1934
Agonopterix nanatella Stainton, 1849
Agonopterix nervosa Haworth, [1811]
Agonopterix pavida Meyrick, 1913
Agonopterix purpurea Haworth, [1811]
Agonopterix ramosella Stainton, 1867
Agonopterix rotundella Douglas, 1846
Agonopterix rutana (Fabricius, 1794)
Agonopterix squamosa Mann, 1864
Agonopterix subpropinquella Stainton, 1849
Agonopterix subumbellana Heinemann, 1959
Agonopterix thapsiella Zeller, 1847
Agonopterix xyleuta Meyrick, 1913
Agonopterix zephyrella (Hübner, [1813])
Alabonia kindermanni Herrich-Schäffer, [1855]
Alabonia staintoniella Zeller, 1850
Amselina cedestiella Zeller, 1868
Amselina emir Gozmany, 1961
Amselina minorita Gozmany, 1968
Amselina olympi Gozmany, 1957
Amselina parapsesta Gozmany, 1986
Anchinia grandis Stainton, 1867
Apatema mediopallidum Walsingham, 1900
Apiletria endopercna Meyrick, 1936
Apiletria luella Lederer, 1855
Apiletria purulentella Stainton, 1867
Aprominta aga Gozmany, 1962
Aprominta arenbergeri Gozmany, 1968
Aprominta bifasciata Staudinger, 1871
Aprominta designatella Herrich-Schäffer, [1855]
Aprominta syriacella Ragonot, 1895
Arragonia anatolica Gozmany, 1986
Athopeutis crinitella Herrich-Schäffer, [1855]
Batia lunaris Haworth, 1828
Borkhausenia cinerariella Mann, 1859
Borkhausenia coeruleopicta Christoph, 1888
Borkhausenia haasi Rebel, 1902
Borkhausenia minutella (Linnaeus, 1758)
Borkhausenia trigutta Christoph, 1888
Cacochroa permixtella Herrich-Schäffer, [1855]
Callima icterinella Mann, 1867
Carcina quercana (Fabricius, 1775)
Crossotocera wagnerella Zerny, 1930
Denisia similella (Hübner, 1796)
Depressaria badiella (Hübner, 1796)
Depressaria chaerophylli Zeller, 1839
Depressaria corticinella Zeller, 1854
Depressaria depressella (Hübner, [1813])
Depressaria douglasella Stainton, 1849
Depressaria floridella Mann, 1864
Depressaria hirtipalpis Zeller, 1854
Depressaria hofmanni Stainton, 1861
Depressaria marcella Rebel, 1901
Depressaria tenebricosa Zeller, 1854
Depressaria veneficella Zeller, 1847
Depressaria zelleri Staudinger, 1879
Diurnea fagella ([Denis & Schiffermüller], 1775)
Donaspastus undecimpunctellus Mann, 1864
Dysspastus cinerascens Gozmany, 1968
Endrosis sarcitrella (Linnaeus, 1758)
Eratophyes amasiella Herrich-Schäffer, [1855]
Esperia imitatrix Zeller, 1847
Esperia intermediella Stainton, 1867
Esperia oliviella (Fabricius, 1794)
Esperia sulphurella (Fabricius, 1775)
Exaeretia ledereri Zeller, 1854
Exaeretia lutosella Herrich-Schäffer, [1854]
Exaeretia nigromaculata Hannemann, 1989
Fabiola pokornyi Nickerl, 1864
Harpella eseliensis Rebel, 1908
Harpella forficella Scopoli, 1763
Hecestoptera kyra Gozmany, 1961
Holcopogon bubulcellus Staudinger, 1859
Holoscolia berytella Rebel, 1902
Holoscolia huebneri Koçak, 1980
Holoscolia majorella Rebel, 1902
Horridopalpus radiatus Staudinger, 1879
Hypercallia citrinalis Scopoli, 1763
Mylothra pyrrhella Ragonot, 1895
Oecogonia caradjai Popescu-Gorj & Capuse, 1965
Oecophora bractella (Linnaeus, 1758)
Orophia denisella ([Denis & Schiffermüller], 1775)
Orophia sordidella (Hübner, 1796)
Pleurota amaniella Mann, 1873
Pleurota armeniella Caradja, 1920
Pleurota christophi Lvovskiy, 1993
Pleurota eximia Lederer, 1861
Pleurota generosella Rebel, 1901
Pleurota issicella Staudinger, 1879
Pleurota malatya Back, 1973
Pleurota metricella Zeller, 1847
Pleurota pungitiella Herrich-Schäffer, [1854]
Pleurota pyropella ([Denis & Schiffermüller], 1775)
Pleurota tristatella Staudinger, 1871
Pleurota tristictella Seebold, 1898
Protasis punctella Costa, [1846]
Pseudatemelia flavifrontella (Denis & Schiffermüller, 1775)
Pseudatemelia sordida Staudinger, 1879
Schiffermuelleria irroratella Staudinger, 1879
Schiffermuelleria schaefferella (Linnaeus, 1758)
Semioscopis osthelderi Rebel, 1935
Symmoca caliginella Mann, 1867
Symmoca deprinsi Gozmány, 2001
Symmoca latiusculella Stainton, 1867
Symmoca salinata Gozmany, 1986
Symmoca sparsella de Joannis, 1891
Symmoca straminella Gozmany, 1986
Symmoca vitiosella Zeller, 1868
Telechrysis tripuncta Haworth, 1828

Ethmiidae
Ethmia amasina Staudinger, 1879
Ethmia aurifluella (Hübner, [1801])
Ethmia bipunctella (Fabricius, 1775)
Ethmia candidella Alphéraky, 1908
Ethmia caradjae Rebel, 1907
Ethmia chrysopyga Zeller, 1844
Ethmia defreinai Ganev, 1984
Ethmia distigmatella Erschoff, 1874
Ethmia dodocea Haworth, 1828
Ethmia fumidella Wocke, 1850
Ethmia funerella (Fabricius, 1787)
Ethmia haemorrhoidella Eversmann, 1844
Ethmia hakkarica Koçak, 1986
Ethmia infelix Meyrick, 1914
Ethmia iranella Zerny, 1940
Ethmia pseudoscythrella Rebel, 1902
Ethmia pusiella (Linnaeus, 1758)
Ethmia quadrinotella Mann, 1861
Ethmia rothshildi Rebel, 1912
Ethmia similis Sattler, 1967
Ethmia suspecta Sattler, 1867
Ethmia terminella T. B. Fletcher, 1938
Ethmia treitschkeella Staudinger, 1879
Ethmia tripunctella Staudinger, 1879

Gelechiidae
Acanthophila alacella Duponchel, 1838
Acompsia cinerella Clerck, 1759
Anacampsis obscurella ([Denis & Schiffermüller], 1775)
Anacampsis populella Clerck, 1759
Anarsia aleurodes Meyrick, 1922
Anarsia lineatella Zeller, 1839
Anarsia spartiella Schrank, 1802
Apatetris mirabella Staudinger, 1880
Apodia bifractella Duponchel, [1843]
Aproaerema anthyllidella (Hübner, [1813])
Aproaerema cincticulella Herrich-Schäffer, [1855]
Aristotelia arnoldella Rebel, 1905
Aristotelia brucinella Mann, 1872
Aristotelia cupreella Zerny, 1934
Aristotelia decoratella Staudinger, 1879
Aristotelia decurtella (Hübner, [1813])
Aristotelia euprepella Zerny, 1934
Aristotelia fervidella Mann, 1864
Aristotelia jactatrix Meyrick, 1926
Aristotelia maculata Staudinger, 1879
Aristotelia osthelderi Rebel, 1935
Aristotelia pancaliella Staudinger, 1870
Aristotelia parvula Staudinger, 1879
Aristotelia punctatella Staudinger, 1879
Aristotelia remissella Zeller, 1847
Aristotelia retusella Rebel, 1891
Aristotelia servella Zeller, 1839
Aristotelia striatopunctella Rebel, 1891
Aristotelia subericinella Herrich-Schäffer, [1855]
Aristotelia unifasciella Rebel, 1929
Aroga aristotelis Milliere, 1875
Aroga pascuicola Staudinger, 1871
Aroga velocella Duponchel, 1838
Bryotropha desertella Douglas, 1850
Bryotropha dryadella Zeller, 1850
Bryotropha terrella ([Denis & Schiffermüller], 1775)
Caryocolum albithoracellum Huemer, 1989
Caryocolum anatolicum Huemer, 1989
Caryocolum gypsophilae Stainton, 1869
Caryocolum horoscopa Meyrick, 1926
Caryocolum iranicum Huemer, 1989
Ceuthomadarus tenebrionellus Mann, 1864
Chionodes distinctella Zeller, 1839
Chionodes hayreddini Koçak, 1985
Chrysoesthia drurella (Fabricius, 1775)
Chrysoesthia sexguttella Thunberg, 1794
Coloptilia conchylidella Hofmann, [1898]
Compsolechia scintillella F.R., 1841
Compsolechia subsequella (Hübner, 1796)
Crossobela trinotella Herrich-Schäffer, [1856]
Deroxena venosulella Moeschler, 1862
Dichomeris barbella ([Denis & Schiffermüller], 1775)
Dichomeris derasella ([Denis & Schiffermüller], 1775)
Dichomeris juniperella (Linnaeus, 1761)
Dichomeris limosella Schläger, 1849
Dichomeris unguiculatus (Fabricius, 1798)
Dirhinosia arnoldiella (Rebel, 1905)
Dirhinosia cervinella (Eversmann, 1844)
Dirhinosia nitidula (Stainton, 1867)
Dirhinosia unifasciella (Rebel, 1929)
Ephysteris deserticolella Staudinger, 1870
Ephysteris promptella Staudinger, 1859
Epilechia magnetella Staudinger, 1870
Ergasiola ergasima Meyrick, 1916
Eulamprotes superbella Zeller, 1839
Eulamprotes wilkella (Linnaeus, 1758)
Eurodachtha flavissimella Mann, 1862
Eurodachtha nigralba Gozmany, 1978
Euscrobipalpa acuminatella Sircom, 1850
Euscrobipalpa artemisiella Treitschke, 1933
Euscrobipalpa atriplicella F.R., 1841
Euscrobipalpa chetitica Povolny, 1974
Euscrobipalpa dividella Rebel, 1936
Euscrobipalpa erichi Povolny, 1964
Euscrobipalpa grossa Povolny, 1966
Euscrobipalpa obsoletella F.R., 1841
Euscrobipalpa ocellatella Boyd, 1858
Euscrobipalpa pulchra Povolny, 1967
Euscrobipalpa smithi Povolny & Bradley, 1964
Euscrobipalpa vladimiri Povolny, 1966
Evippe penicillata Amsel, 1961
Filatima spurcella Duponchel, 1843
Gelechia fuscantella Heinemann, 1870
Gelechia indignella Staudinger, 1879
Gelechia invenustella Berg., 1875
Gelechia pistaciae Filipjev, 1933
Gelechia repetitrix Meyrick, 1931
Gelechia sabinella Zeller, 1839
Gelechia senticetella Staudinger, 1859
Gelechia stramentella Rebel, 1935
Gnorimoschema antiquum Povolny, 1966
Gnorimoschema tetrameris Meyrick, 1926
Homaloxestis briantiella Turati, 1879
Homaloxestis hades Gozmany, 1978
Inotica gaesata Meyrick, 1913
Isophrictis anthemidella Wocke, 1871
Isophrictis invisella Constant, 1885
Isophrictis kefersteiniella Zeller, 1850
Isophrictis lineatella Zeller, 1850
Isophrictis striatella ([Denis & Schiffermüller], 1775)
Iwaruna biguttella Duponchel, 1843
Lecithocera anatolica Gozmany, 1978
Lecithocera nigrana Duponchel, 1836
Lecithocera syriella Gozmany, 1978
Megacraspedus argyroneurellus Staudinger, 1870
Megacraspedus attritellus Staudinger, 1870
Megacraspedus imparellus F.R., 1837
Megacraspedus incertellus Rebel, 1930
Megacraspedus monolorellus Rebel, 1906
Megacraspedus separatellus F.R., 1837
Mesophleps pudicellus Mann, 1861
Mesophleps pyropella (Hübner, 1793)
Metanarsia modesta Staudinger, 1870
Metzneria aestivella Zeller, 1839
Metzneria agraphella Ragonot, 1895
Metzneria aprilella Herrich-Schäffer, [1850]
Metzneria ehikeella Gozmany, 1954
Metzneria intestinella Mann, 1864
Metzneria litigiosella Milliere, 1879
Metzneria metzneriella Stainton, 1851
Metzneria paucipunctella Zeller, 1839
Metzneria tenuiella Mann, 1864
Mirificarma aflavella Duponchel, 1844
Mirificarma eburnella ([Denis & Schiffermüller], 1775)
Mirificarma lentiginosella Zeller, 1839
Mirificarma maculatella (Hübner, 1796)
Mirificarma rhodoptera Mann, 1866
Monochroa lutulentella Zeller, 1839
Monochroa tenebrella (Hübner, [1817])
Neofaculta confidella Rebel, 1935
Neofaculta ericetella Geyer, [1832]
Neofaculta stictella Rebel
Neofriseria sceptrophora Meyrick, 1926
Nothris chinganella Christoph, 1882
Nothris sabulosella Rebel, 1935
Nothris sulcella Staudinger, 1879
Nothris verbascella Brahm, 1791
Onebala lamprostoma Zeller, 1847
Ornativalva heluanensis Debski, 1913
Ornativalva mixolitha Meyrick, 1918
Ornativalva ochraceofusca Sattler, 1967
Ornativalva ornatella Sattler, 1967
Ornativalva plutelliformis Staudinger, 1859
Palumbina guerinii Stainton, 1857
Pexicopia umbrella ([Denis & Schiffermüller], 1775)
Phthorimaea sabulosella Rebel, 1906
Platyedra gossypiella Saunders, 1843
Platyedra subcinerea Haworth, 1828
Platyedra vilella Zeller, 1847
Pogochaetia solitaria Staudinger, 1879
Prolita solutella Zeller, 1839
Prolita virgella Thunberg, 1794
Pseudotelphusa fugitivella Zeller, 1839
Pseudotelphusa scalella Scopoli, 1763
Psoricoptera gibbosella Stainton, 1854
Ptocheuusa campicolella Mann, 1857
Ptocheuusa paupella Zeller, 1847
Recurvaria leucatella Clerck, 1759
Recurvaria nanella ([Denis & Schiffermüller], 1775)
Scrobipalpa anatolica Povolny, 1973
Scrobipalpa bazae Povolny, 1977
Scrobipalpa bryophiloides Povolny, 1966
Scrobipalpa fraterna Povolny, 1973
Scrobipalpa halophila Povolny, 1973
Scrobipalpa heliopa Lower, 1900
Scrobipalpa heretica Povolny, 1973
Scrobipalpa meteorica Povolny, 1984
Scrobipalpa nana Povolny, 1973
Scrobipalpa remota Povolny, 1972
Scrobipalpula psilella Herrich-Schäffer, [1854]
Sitotroga cerealella Olivier, 1789
Sophronia consanguinella Herrich-Schäffer, [1855]
Sophronia finitimella Rebel, 1906
Sophronia humerella ([Denis & Schiffermüller], 1775)
Sophronia illustrella (Hübner, 1796)
Stenolechia gemmella (Linnaeus, 1758)
Stenolechia nigrinotella Zeller, 1847
Stenolechia sagittella Caradja, 1920
Stomopteryx detersella Zeller, 1847
Stomopteryx patruella Mann, 1857
Syncopacma captivella Herrich-Schäffer, [1854]
Syncopacma coronilella Treitschke, 1833
Syncopacma maraschella Caradja, 1920
Syncopacma polychromella Rebel, 1902
Syncopacma sangiella Stainton, 1863
Syncopacma splendens Staudinger, 1881
Syncopacma syncrita Meyrick, 1926
Syncopacma taeniolella Zeller, 1839
Syncopacma vorticella Scopoli, 1763
Teleiodes decorella Haworth, 1812
Teleiodes luculella (Hübner, [1813])
Teleiodes ostentella Zerny, 1933
Teleiodes paripunctella Thunberg, 1794
Teleiodes proximella (Hübner, 1796)
Teleiodes vulgella ([Denis & Schiffermüller], 1775)
Teleiopsis bagriotella Duponchel, [1840]
Teleiopsis diffinis Haworth, 1828
Teleiopsis latisacculus Pitkin, 1988
Teleiopsis terebinthinella Herrich-Schäff., [1856]
Telphusa comedonella Staudinger, 1879
Telphusa mersinella Staudinger, 1879
Telphusa praedicata Meyrick, 1923
Telphusa wagneriella Rebel, 1926
Tila sequanda Povolny, 1974
Turcopalpa glaseri Povolny, 1973
Xenolechia scriptella (Hübner, 1796)
Xenolechia tristis Staudinger, 1879
Xystophora arundinetella Stainton, 1858
Xystophora carchariella Zeller, 1839

Xyloryctidae
Odites kollarella Costa, [1836]

Momphidae
Mompha lacteella Stephens, 1834
Mompha miscella ([Denis & Schiffermüller], 1775)
Mompha subbistrigella Haworth, 1828

Cosmopterigidae
Allotalanta autophaea Meyrick, 1913
Ascalenia vanelloides Gerasimov, 1930
Coccidiphila lederiella Zeller, 1850
Cosmopterix scribaiella Zeller, 1850
Cosmopterix zieglerella (Hübner, [1810])
Eteobalea albiapicella Duponchel, 1843
Eteobalea beata Walsingham, 1907
Eteobalea dohrnii Zeller, 1847
Eteobalea intermediella Riedl, 1966
Eteobalea isabellella Costa, 1836
Eteobalea serratella Treitschke, 1833
Eteobalea sumptuosella Lederer, 1855
Pancalia leuwenhoekella (Linnaeus, 1761)
Pancalia nodosella Mann, 1854
Pyroderces argyrogrammos Zeller, 1847
Sorhagenia lophyrella Douglas, 1846
Sorhagenia rhamniella Zeller, 1839
Tolliella fulguritella Ragonot, 1895
Vulcaniella cognatella Riedl, 1991
Vulcaniella fiordalisa Petry, 1904
Vulcaniella glaseri Riedl, 1966
Vulcaniella grabowiella Staudinger, 1859
Vulcaniella pomposella Zeller, 1839

Scythridae
Scythris aerariella Herrich-Schäffer, [1854]
Scythris amphonycella Geyer, [1836]
Scythris anomaloptera Staudinger, 1880
Scythris apicalis Zeller, 1847
Scythris asiatica Staudinger, 1880
Scythris basistrigella Staudinger, 1880
Scythris canescens Staudinger, 1880
Scythris caramani Staudinger, 1880
Scythris cupreella Staudinger, 1859
Scythris discimaculella Rebel, 1935
Scythris dissimilella Herrich-Schäffer, [1855]
Scythris emichi Anker, 1870
Scythris fallacella Schläger, 1847
Scythris flabella Mann, 1861
Scythris flaviventrella Herrich-Schäffer, 1850
Scythris gravotella Zeller, 1847
Scythris iconiensis Rebel, 1903
Scythris jaeckhi Bengtsson, 1989
Scythris limbella (Fabricius, 1775)
Scythris moldavicella Rebel, 1906
Scythris monochreella Ragonot, 1895
Scythris obscurella Scopoli, 1763
Scythris ottomana Jäckh, 1978
Scythris paelopyga Staudinger, 1880
Scythris pascuella Zeller, 1852
Scythris pfeifferella Rebel, 1935
Scythris platypyga Staudinger, 1880
Scythris punctivittella Costa, [1836]
Scythris seliniella Zeller, 1839
Scythris senescens Stainton, 1854
Scythris subclavella Rebel, 1900
Scythris subfasciata Staudinger, 1880
Scythris tabescentella Staudinger, 1880
Scythris tabidella Herrich-Schäffer, [1854]
Scythris taurella Caradja, 1920
Scythris tenuisquamata Staudinger, 1880
Scythris tenuivittella Stainton, 1867
Scythris triguttella Zeller, 1839
Scythris unimaculella Rebel, 1905
Scythris vagabundella Herrich-Schäffer, [1854]
Scythris vittella Costa, [1836]
Syringopais temperatella Lederer, 1855

Alucitidae
Alucita cancellata Meyrick, 1908
Alucita cinnerethella Amsel, 1935
Alucita cymatodactyla Zeller, 1852
Alucita grammodactyla Zeller, 1841
Alucita hexadactyla Linnaeus, 1758
Alucita huebneri Wallengren, 1859
Alucita major Rebel, 1905
Alucita palodactyla Zeller, 1847
Alucita tridentata Scholz & Jäckh, 1994
Alucita zonodactyla Zeller, 1847

Epermeniidae
Epermenia aequidentella Hofmann, 1867
Epermenia chaerophyllella Goeze, 1776
Epermenia insecurella Stainton, 1849
Epermenia ochreomaculella Milliere, 1854
Epermenia orientalis Gaedike, 1966
Epermenia pontificella (Hübner, 1796)
Epermenia strictella Wocke, 1867
Epermenia wockeella Staudinger, 1880
Ochromolopis ictella (Hübner, [1813])
Ochromolopis staintoniella Milliere, 1869
Phaulernis fulviguttella Zeller, 1839

Yponomeutidae
Acrolepiopsis vesperella Zeller, 1850
Atemelia torquatella Lienig & Zeller, 1846
Digitivalva glaseri Gaedike, 1971
Digitivalva occidentella Klimesch, 1956
Digitivalva reticulella (Hübner, 1796)
Eidophasia messingiella F.R., 1837
Eidophasia syenitella Herrich-Schäffer, [1851]
Eidophasia tauricella Staudinger, 1879
Inuliphila pulicariae Klimesch, 1956
Inuliphila wolfschlaegeri Klimesch, 1956
Kessleria caucasica Friese, 1960
Kessleria impura Staudinger, 1879
Kessleria osyridella Milliere, 1869
Niphonympha albella Zeller, 1847
Paraswammerdamia lutarea Haworth, 1828
Phrealcia friesei Mey, 2012
Plutella porrectella (Linnaeus, 1758)
Plutella xylostella (Linnaeus, 1758)
Prays fraxinella Bjerkander, 1784
Prays oleae Bernard, 1788
Pseudoswammerdamia combinella (Hübner, 1796)
Rhigognotis senilella Zetterstedt, [1839]
Theristis mucronella Scopoli, 1763
Yponomeuta evonymellus (Linnaeus, 1758)
Yponomeuta irrorellus (Hübner, 1796)
Yponomeuta padellus (Linnaeus, 1758)
Yponomeuta plumbellus ([Denis & Schiffermüller], 1775)
Yponomeuta rorrellus (Hübner, 1796)
Ypsolopha albiramella Mann, 1861
Ypsolopha asperella (Linnaeus, 1761)
Ypsolopha dentella ([Denis & Schiffermüller], 1775)
Ypsolopha excisella Lederer, 1855
Ypsolopha instabilella Mann, 1866
Ypsolopha kristalleniae Rebel, 1916
Ypsolopha manniella Staudinger, 1880
Ypsolopha paranthesella (Linnaeus, 1761)
Ypsolopha persicella (Fabricius, 1787)
Ypsolopha sculpturella (Herrich-Schäffer, 1854)
Ypsolopha semitessella Mann, 1861
Ypsolopha sequella Clerk, 1759
Ypsolopha trichoriella Mann, 1861
Ypsolopha ustella Clerck, 1759
Ypsolopha vittella (Linnaeus, 1758)
Zelleria hepariella Stainton, 1849

Ochsenheimeriidae
Ochsenheimeria taurella ([Denis & Schiffermüller], 1775)

Lyonetidae
Bedellia somnulentella Zeller, 1847
Leucoptera malifoliella Costa, 1836
Lyonetia prunifoliella (Hübner, 1796)

Glyphipterigidae
Glyphipterix equitella Scopoli, 1763
Glyphipterix forsterella (Fabricius, 1787)
Glyphipterix simpliciella Stephens, 1834
Glyphipterix thrasonella Scopoli, 1763

Argyresthiidae
Argyresthia abdominalis Zeller, 1839
Argyresthia conjugella Zeller, 1839
Argyresthia mendica Haworth, 1828
Argyresthia pretiosa Staudinger, 1880
Argyresthia pruniella (Linnaeus, 1761)

Heliodinidae
Heliodines roesella (Linnaeus, 1758)

Schreckensteiniidae
Schreckensteinia festaliella (Hübner, [1819])

Brachodidae
Brachodes anatolicus Kallies, 2001
Brachodes appendiculata (Esper, [1783])
Brachodes buxeus Kallies, 2001
Brachodes candefacta Lederer, 1858
Brachodes caradjae Rebel, 1902
Brachodes dispar Herrich-Schäffer, [1854]
Brachodes orientalis Rebel, 1905
Brachodes pumila Ochsenheimer, 1808
Brachodes tristis Staudinger, 1879
Phycodes chalcocrossa Meyrick, 1909
Phycodes radiata Ochsenheimer, 1808

Sesiidae
Bembecia ichneumoniformis ([Denis & Schiffermüller], 1775)
Bembecia illustris Stgr. & Rebel, 1901
Bembecia lomatiaeformis Lederer, 1853
Bembecia pontica Staudinger, 1891
Bembecia sanguinolenta Lederer, 1853
Bembecia scopigera Scopoli, 1763
Bembecia stiziformis Herrich-Schäffer, 1851
Chamaesphecia albiventris Lederer, 1853
Chamaesphecia alysoniformis Herrich-Schäffer, 1846
Chamaesphecia anatolica Schwingenschuss, 1938
Chamaesphecia annellata Zeller, 1847
Chamaesphecia aurifera Romanoff, 1885
Chamaesphecia bibioniformis (Esper, [1800])
Chamaesphecia chalciformis (Esper, [1804])
Chamaesphecia colpiformis Staudinger, 1856
Chamaesphecia doleriformis Herrich-Schäffer, 1846
Chamaesphecia doryceraeformis Lederer, 1853
Chamaesphecia elampiformis Herrich-Schäffer, 1851
Chamaesphecia empiformis (Esper, [1783])
Chamaesphecia euceraeformis Ochsenheimer, 1816
Chamaesphecia gorbunovi Spatenka, 1992
Chamaesphecia haberhaueri Staudinger, 1879
Chamaesphecia leucopsiformis (Esper, [1800])
Chamaesphecia masariformis Ochsenheimer, 1808
Chamaesphecia minor Staudinger, 1856
Chamaesphecia proximata Staudinger, 1891
Chamaesphecia regula Staudinger, 1891
Chamaesphecia schmidtiiformis Freyer, 1836
Chamaesphecia tahira Kallies & Petersen, 1995
Chamaesphecia tenthrediniformis ([Denis & Schiffermüller], 1775)
Euhagena palariformis Lederer, 1858
Osminia fenusaeformis Herrich-Schäffer, 1852
Paranthrene insolita Cerf, 1914
Paranthrene tabaniformis (Rottemburg, 1775)
Pennisetia hylaeiformis Laspeyres, 1801
Pyropteron chrysidiforme (Esper, [1782])
Pyropteron minianiforme Freyer, 1845
Sesia apiformis (Linnaeus, 1761)
Sesia bembeciformis (Hübner, [1806])
Sesia melanocephala Dalman, 1816
Sesia pimplaeformis Oberthür, 1872
Synansphecia affinis Staudinger, 1856
Synansphecia leucomelaena Zeller, 1847
Synansphecia mannii Lederer, 1853
Synansphecia muscaeformis (Esper, [1783])
Synansphecia triannuliformis Freyer, 1845
Synanthedon andrenaeforme Laspeyres, 1801
Synanthedon cephiforme Ochsenheimer, 1808
Synanthedon formicaeforme (Esper, [1783])
Synanthedon myopaeforme Borkhausen, 1789
Synanthedon pipiziforme Lederer, 1855
Synanthedon stomoxiforme (Hübner, 1790)
Synanthedon tipuliforme Clerck, 1759
Synanthedon vespiforme (Linnaeus, 1761)
Tinthia brosiformis (Hübner, [1813])
Tinthia cingulata Staudinger, 1870
Tinthia hoplisiformis Mann, 1864
Tinthia myrmosaeformis Herrich-Schäffer, 1846
Tinthia tineiformis (Esper, [1789])

Choreutidae
Anthophila fabriciana (Linnaeus, 1767)
Choreutis nemorana (Hübner, [1799])
Choreutis pariana Clerck, 1759
Millieria dolosana Herrich-Schäffer, [1854]
Prochoreutis myllerana (Fabricius, 1794)
Prochoreutis sehestediana (Fabricius, 1777)
Prochoreutis stellaris Zeller, 1847
Tebenna bjerkandrella Borgström, 1784

Cossidae
Arctiocossus striolatus Rothshild, 1912
Azygophleps regia Staudinger, 1892
Cecryphalus nubila Staudinger, 1895
Cossulus argentatus Staudinger, 1887
Cossulus intrictatus Staudinger, 1887
Cossulus lignosus Brandt, 1938
Cossus araraticus Teich, 1896
Cossus cossus (Linnaeus, 1758)
Cossus funkei Röber, 1896
Dieida ledereri Staudinger, 1871
Dyspessa argaeensis Rebel, 1902
Dyspessa emilia Staudinger, 1878
Dyspessa hethitica Daniel, 1938
Dyspessa pallidata Staudinger, 1892
Dyspessa salicicola Eversmann, 1848
Dyspessa ulula Borkhausen, 1790
Dyspessacossus fereidun Grum-Grshimailo, 1895
Dyspessacossus hadjiensis Daniel, 1953
Dyspessacossus osthelderi Daniel, 1932
Holcocerus volgensis Christoph, 1893
Isoceras bipunctatum Staudinger, 1887
Isoceras huberi Eitschberger & Ströhle, 1987
Lamellocossus terebra Denis, 1785
Paracossulus thrips (Hübner, [1813])
Parahypopta caestrum (Hübner, [1808])
Paropta paradoxa Herrich-Schäffer, [1851]
Phragmacossia albida Erschoff, 1874
Phragmataecia castaneae (Hübner, 1790)
Samagystia cuhensis Freina, 1994
Stygioides colchica Herrich-Schäffer, [1851]
Stygioides psychidion Staudinger, 1870
Stygioides tricolor Lederer, 1858
Zeuzera pyrina (Linnaeus, 1761)

Zygaenidae
Adscita drenowskii Alberti, 1939
Adscita geryon Hübner, [1813]
Adscita mannii Lederer, 1852
Adscita obscura Zeller, 1847
Adscita statices (Linnaeus, 1758)
Adscita storaiae Tarmann, 1977
Clelea syriaca Hampson, 1919
Jordanita chloronota Staudinger, 1870
Jordanita chloros (Hübner, [1813])
Jordanita globulariae (Hübner, 1793)
Jordanita graeca Jordan, 1909
Jordanita syriaca Alberti, 1937
Jordanita tenuicornis Zeller, 1847
Lucasiterna subsolana Staudinger, 1862
Praviela anatolica Naufock, 1929
Rhagades amasina Herrich-Schäffer, [1851]
Roccia budensis Speyer & Speyer, 1858
Roccia hector Jordan, 1909
Roccia kurdica Tarmann, 1987
Roccia notata Zeller, 1847
Roccia staudingeri Alberti, 1954
Roccia volgensis Möschler, 1862
Theresimima ampelophaga Bayle, 1809
Zygaena adscharica Reiss, 1935
Zygaena araxis Koch, 1936
Zygaena armena Eversmann, 1851
Zygaena brizae (Esper, [1800])
Zygaena cambysea Lederer, 1870
Zygaena carniolica Scopoli, 1763
Zygaena cuvieri Boisduval, 1828
Zygaena cynarae (Esper, [1789])
Zygaena dorycnii Ochsenheimer, 1808
Zygaena ephialtes (Linnaeus, 1767)
Zygaena filipendulae (Linnaeus, 1758)
Zygaena formosa Herrich-Schäffer, [1852]
Zygaena fraxini Ménétriés, 1832
Zygaena graslini Lederer, 1855
Zygaena haematina Kollar, [1849]
Zygaena laeta (Hübner, 1790)
Zygaena laetifica Herrich-Schäffer, [1846]
Zygaena lonicerae Schewen, 1777
Zygaena loti ([Denis & Schiffermüller], 1775)
Zygaena lydia Staudinger, 1887
Zygaena manlia Lederer, 1870
Zygaena minos ([Denis & Schiffermüller], 1775)
Zygaena olivieri Boisduval, 1828
Zygaena osterodensis Reiss, 1921
Zygaena peschmerga Eckweiler & Görgner, 1981
Zygaena problematica Naumann, 1966
Zygaena punctum Ochsenheimer, 1808
Zygaena purpuralis Brünnlich, 1763
Zygaena rosinae Korb, 1902
Zygaena sedi (Fabricius, 1787)
Zygaena tamara Christoph, 1889
Zygaena viciae ([Denis & Schiffermüller], 1775)
Zygaenoprocris capitalis Staudinger, 1879

Limacodidae
Apoda limacodes (Hufnagel, 1766)
Heterogenea cruciata Knoch, 1783
Hoyosia cretica Rebel, 1906
Latoia inexpectata Staudinger, 1900

Tortricidae
Ablabia goiiana (Linnaeus, 1761)
Acleris boscana (Fabricius, 1794)
Acleris boscanoides Razowski, 1959
Acleris fuscana (Fabricius, 1787)
Acleris literana (Linnaeus, 1758)
Acleris napaea Meyrick, 1912
Acleris osthelderi Obraztsov, 1949
Acleris permutana Duponchel, 1836
Acleris quercinana Zeller, 1849
Acleris rhombana ([Denis & Schiffermüller], 1775)
Acleris scabrana ([Denis & Schiffermüller], 1775)
Acleris tripunctana (Hübner, 1793)
Acleris undulana Walsingham, 1900
Acleris variegana ([Denis & Schiffermüller], 1775)
Agapeta hamana (Linnaeus, 1758)
Agapeta zoegana (Linnaeus, 1767)
Aleimma loeflingiana (Linnaeus, 1758)
Ancylis achatana ([Denis & Schiffermüller], 1775)
Ancylis apicella ([Denis & Schiffermüller], 1775)
Ancylis badiana ([Denis & Schiffermüller], 1775)
Ancylis comptana Fröhlich, 1828
Ancylis mitterbacheriana ([Denis & Schiffermüller], 1775)
Ancylis obtusana Haworth, [1811]
Ancylis selenana Guenée, 1845
Ancylis unculana Haworth, [1811]
Anoplocnephasia orientana Alphéraky, 1876
Anoplocnephasia sedana Constant, 1884
Aphelia euxina Djakonov, 1929
Aphelia ignoratana Staudinger, 1879
Aphelia insincera Meyrick, 1912
Aphelia ochreana (Hübner, [1799])
Aphelia palaeana (Hübner, 1793)
Aphelia viburniana (Fabricius, 1787)
Archips crataeganus (Hübner, [1799])
Archips hebenstreitellus (Müller, 1764)
Archips podanus Scopoli, 1763
Archips rosanus (Linnaeus, 1758)
Archips vulpeculanus Fuchs, 1903
Archips xylosteanus (Linnaeus, 1758)
Argyrotaenia pulchellana Haworth, [1811]
Aspila funebrana Treitschke, 1835
Aspila janthinana Duponhcel, 1835
Aterpia anderreggana Guenée, 1845
Bactra lanceolana (Hübner, [1799])
Bactra robustana Christoph, 1872
Bactra Stephens, 1834
Barbara herrichiana Obraztsov, 1960
Barbara osmana Obraztsov, 1952
Cacochroea turbidana Treitschke, 1835
Cacoecimorpha pronubana (Hübner, [1799])
Capricornia boisduvaliana Duponchel, 1836
Celypha anatoliana Caradja, 1916
Celypha cespitana (Hübner, [1817])
Celypha flavipalpana Herrich-Schäffer, [1851]
Celypha rurestrana Duponchel, 1843
Ceratoxanthis argentomixtana Staudinger, 1870
Choristoneura diversana (Hübner, [1817])
Cirriphora pharaonana Kollar, 1858
Clepsis senecionana (Hübner, [1819])
Cnephasia alternella Stephens, 1852
Cnephasia anatolica Obraztsov, 1950
Cnephasia asiatica Kuznetsov, 1956
Cnephasia bizensis Réal, 1953
Cnephasia chrysantheana Duponchel, 1843
Cnephasia communana Herrich-Schäffer, [1851]
Cnephasia cupressivorana Staudinger, 1871
Cnephasia facetana Kennel, 1901
Cnephasia fragosana Zeller, 1847
Cnephasia helenica Obraztsov, 1950
Cnephasia heringi Razowski, 1958
Cnephasia kenneli Obraztsov, 1956
Cnephasia korvaci Razowski, 1965
Cnephasia longana Haworth, [1811]
Cnephasia maraschana Caradja, 1916
Cnephasia orthoxyana Réal, 1951
Cnephasia osthelderi Obraztsov, 1950
Cnephasia pascuana (Hübner, [1799])
Cnephasia semibrunneata de Joannis, 1891
Cnephasia syriella Razowski, 1956
Cnephasia tianshanica Filipjev, 1934
Cnephasia tristrami Walsingham, 1900
Cnephasia virgaureana Treitschke, 1835
Cnephasia virginana Kennel, 1899
Cnephasiella abrasana Duponchel, 1843
Cnephasiella incertana Treitschke, 1835
Cochylidia rupicola Curtis, 1834
Cochylimorpha alternana Stephens, 1834
Cochylimorpha armeniana de Joannis, 1891
Cochylimorpha chamomillana Herrich-Schäff, [1851]
Cochylimorpha diana Kennel, 1899
Cochylimorpha discolorana Kennel, 1899
Cochylimorpha eburneana Kennel, 1899
Cochylimorpha elongana F.R., 1839
Cochylimorpha fucosa Razowski, 1970
Cochylimorpha hilarana Herrich-Schäffer, [1851]
Cochylimorpha kurdistana Amsel, 1959
Cochylimorpha langeana Kalchberg, 1897
Cochylimorpha meridiana Staudinger, 1859
Cochylimorpha meridiolana Ragonot, 1894
Cochylimorpha nodulana Möschler, 1862
Cochylimorpha nomadana Erschoff, 1874
Cochylimorpha pyramidana Staudinger, 1870
Cochylimorpha sparsana Staudinger, 1879
Cochylimorpha wiltshirei Razowski, 1963
Cochylis defessana Mann, 1861
Cochylis epilinana Duponchel, 1842
Cochylis hybridella (Hübner, [1813])
Cochylis maestana Kennel, 1899
Cochylis militariana Derra, 1990
Cochylis nana Haworth, [1811]
Cochylis pallidana Zeller, 1847
Cochylis posterana Zeller, 1847
Cochylis roseana Haworth, [1811]
Cochylis salebrana Mann, 1862
Collicularia microgrammana Guenée, 1845
Commophila bilbaensis Rössler, 1877
Commophila cremonana Ragonot, 1894
Commophila deaurana Peyerimhoff, 1877
Commophila ferruginea Walsingham, 1900
Commophila flagellana Duponchel, 1836
Commophila francillana (Fabricius, 1794)
Commophila hartmanniana Clerck, 1759
Commophila iranica Razowski, 1963
Commophila kasyi Razowski, 1962
Commophila kindermanniana Treitschke, 1830
Commophila margarotana Duponchel, 1836
Commophila mauritanica Walsingham, 1898
Commophila moribundana Staudinger, 1859
Commophila nefandana Kennel, 1899
Commophila pannosana Kennel, 1913
Commophila prangana Kennel, 1900
Commophila sanguinana Treitschke, 1830
Commophila smeathmanniana (Fabricius, 1781)
Commophila speciosa Razowski, 1962
Commophila tesserana (Hübner, [1817])
Commophila tornella Walsingham, 1898
Commophila williana Brahm, 1791
Crocidosema plebejana Zeller, 1847
Croesia bergmanniana (Linnaeus, 1758)
Croesia forskaleana (Linnaeus, 1758)
Croesia holmiana (Linnaeus, 1758)
Cryptocochylis conjunctana Mann, 1864
Cydia alienana Caradja, 1916
Cydia conicolana Heylaerts, 1874
Cydia duplicana Zetterstedt, 1840
Cydia junctistrigana Walsingham, 1900
Cydia leucogrammana Hofmann, 1898
Cydia nigricana (Fabricius, 1794)
Cydia oxytropidis Martini, 1912
Cydia pfeifferi Rebel, 1935
Cydia phalacris Meyrick, 1912
Cydia pomonella (Linnaeus, 1758)
Cydia pyrivora Danilevsky, 1947
Cydia succedana ([Denis & Schiffermüller], 1775)
Diceratura ostrinana Guenée, 1845
Diceratura rhodograpta Djakonov, 1929
Diceratura roseofasciana Mann, 1855
Dichelia alexiana Kennel, 1919
Dichrorampha acuminatana Lienig & Zeller, 1846
Dichrorampha cinerosana Herrich-Schäffer, [1851]
Dichrorampha coniana Obraztsov, 1953
Dichrorampha petiverella (Linnaeus, 1758)
Dichrorampha plumbagana Treitschke, 1830
Dichrorampha proxima Danilevsky, 1948
Dichroramphoides agilana Tengström, 1847
Dichroramphoides gueneeana Obraztsov, 1953
Endothenia ericetana Humphreys & Westwood, 1854
Endothenia gentianeana (Hübner, [1799])
Endothenia illepidana Kennel, 1901
Endothenia lapideana Herrich-Schäffer, [1851]
Endothenia marginana Haworth, [1811]
Endothenia quadrimaculana Haworth, [1811]
Epagoge grotiana (Fabricius, 1781)
Epiblema farfarae T. B. Fletcher, 1938
Epiblema foenella (Linnaeus, 1758)
Epiblema gammana Mann, 1866
Epiblema graphana Treitschke, 1835
Epiblema hepaticana Treitschke, 1835
Epiblema junctana Herrich-Schäffer, [1856]
Epiblema scutulana ([Denis & Schiffermüller], 1775)
Epinotia abbreviana (Fabricius, 1794)
Epinotia brunnichiana (Linnaeus, 1767)
Epinotia cruciana (Linnaeus, 1761)
Epinotia dalmatana Rebel, 1891
Epinotia deruptana Kennel, 1901
Epinotia festivana (Hübner, [1799])
Epinotia kochiana Herrich-Schäffer, [1851]
Epinotia nigricana Herrich-Schäffer, [1851]
Epinotia ramella (Linnaeus, 1758)
Epinotia thapsiana Zeller, 1847
Eriopsela quadrana (Hübner, [1813])
Eucelis nigritana Mann, 1862
Eucosma agnatana Christoph, 1872
Eucosma albidulana Herrich-Schäffer, [1851]
Eucosma cana Haworth, [1811]
Eucosma coagulana Kennel, 1901
Eucosma conformana Mann, 1872
Eucosma directa Meyrick, 1912
Eucosma eremodora Meyrick, 1932
Eucosma gypsatana Kennel, 1921
Eucosma hohenwarthiana ([Denis & Schiffermüller], 1775)
Eucosma sparsana Rebel, 1935
Eucosma umbratana Staudinger, 1879
Eucosma urbana Kennel, 1901
Eudemis profundana ([Denis & Schiffermüller], 1775)
Eugnosta lathoniana (Hübner, [1800])
Eugnosta magnificana Rebel, 1914
Eupoecilia ambiguella (Hübner, 1796)
Eupoecilia angustana (Hübner, [1799])
Falseuncaria ruficiliana Haworth, [1811]
Fulvoclysia arguta Razowski, 1968
Fulvoclysia aulica Razowski, 1968
Fulvoclysia defectana Lederer, 1870
Fulvoclysia dictyodana Staudinger, 1879
Fulvoclysia nerminae Koçak, 1982
Fulvoclysia pallorana Lederer, 1864
Fulvoclysia proxima Razowski, 1970
Fulvoclysia subdolana Kennel, 1901
Grapholita adjunctana Kennel, 1901
Grapholita caecana Schläger, 1847
Grapholita compositella (Fabricius, 1775)
Grapholita coronillana Lienig & Zeller, 1846
Grapholita dorsana (Fabricius, 1775)
Grapholita fissana Fröhlich, 1828
Grapholita gemmiferana Treitschke, 1835
Grapholita jungiella (Linnaeus, 1761)
Grapholita lunulana ([Denis & Schiffermüller], 1775)
Grapholita nebritana Treitschke, 1830
Grapholita orobana Treitschke, 1830
Grapholita pallifrontana Lienig & Zeller, 1846
Grapholita selenana Zeller, 1847
Grapholita selliferana Kennel, 1901
Grapholita sinana Felder, 1874
Gypsonoma aceriana Duponchel, 1843
Gypsonoma dealbana Fröhlich, 1828
Gypsonoma nitidulana Lienig, 1846
Gypsonoma simulantana Staudinger, 1880
Hedya nubiferana Haworth, [1811]
Hedya ochroleucana Fröhlich, 1828
Hedya pruniana (Hübner, [1799])
Hedya salicella (Linnaeus, 1758)
Hedya schreberiana (Linnaeus, 1761)
Hedya sororiana Herrich-Schäffer, [1851]
Hysterophora maculosana Haworth, [1811]
Isotrias hybridana (Hübner, [1817])
Isotrias rectifasciana Haworth, [1811]
Kenneliola amplana (Hübner, [1799])
Kenneliola fagiglandana Zeller, 1841
Kenneliola inquinatana (Hübner, [1799])
Kenneliola molybdana Constant, 1884
Kenneliola splendana (Hübner, [1799])
Lathronympha strigana (Fabricius, 1775)
Lipoptycha grueneriana Herrich-Schäffer, [1851]
Lobesia artemisiana Zeller, 1847
Lobesia bicinctana Duponchel, 1844
Lobesia cinerariae Nolcken, 1882
Lobesia glebifera Meyrick, 1912
Lobesia littoralis Humprey & Westwood, 1845
Lobesia porrectana Zeller, 1847
Lobesia quaggana Mann, 1855
Lobesia reliquana (Hübner, [1825])
Lobesia vitisana Jacquin, 1788
Lobesiodes euphorbiana Freyer, 1842
Lobesiodes occidentis Falkovitsh, 1970
Loxoterma aurofasciana Haworth, [1811]
Loxoterma lacunana ([Denis & Schiffermüller], 1775)
Loxoterma rivulana Scopoli, 1763
Lozotaenia djakonovi Danilevsky, 1963
Lozotaenia forsteriana (Fabricius, 1781)
Lozotaenia Stephens, 1829
Lozotaeniodes cupressana Duponchel, 1836
Neosphaleroptera nubilana Haworth, [1811]
Notocelia cynosbatella (Linnaeus, 1758)
Notocelia incarnatana Zincken, 1821
Notocelia orientana Caradja, 1916
Notocelia roborana Illiger, 1801
Notocelia suffusana Duponchel, 1843
Notocelia uddmanniana (Linnaeus, 1758)
Olethreutes arcuella (Linnaeus, 1761)
Olindia schumacherana (Fabricius, 1787)
Orthotaenia undulana ([Denis & Schiffermüller], 1775)
Oxypteron impar Staudinger, 1871
Pammene albunginana Guenée, 1845
Pammene amygdalana Duponchel, 1843
Pammene blockiana Herrich-Schäffer, [1851]
Pammene crataegophila Amsel, 1935
Pammene fasciana (Linnaeus, 1761)
Pammene germmana (Hübner, [1799])
Pammene insulana Guenée, 1845
Pammene luedersiana Sorhagen, 1885
Pammene mariana Zerny, 1920
Pammene ochsenheimeriana Lienig & Zeller, 1846
Pammene pontica Obraztsov, 1960
Pammene pullana Kuznetsov, 1986
Pammene regiana Zeller, 1849
Pammene rhediella (Linnaeus, 1761)
Pammene splendidulana Guenée, 1845
Pammene trauniana ([Denis & Schiffermüller], 1775)
Paralipoptycha plumbana Scopoli, 1763
Pelochrista agrestana Treitschke, 1830
Pelochrista arabescana Eversmann, 1844
Pelochrista caecimaculana (Hübner, [1799])
Pelochrista definitana Kennel, 1901
Pelochrista hepatariana Herrich-Schäffer, [1851]
Pelochrista infidana (Hübner, [1824])
Pelochrista medullana Staudinger, 1879
Pelochrista modicana Zeller, 1847
Pelochrista praefractana Kennel, 1901
Pelochrista seriana Kennel, 1901
Phalonidia acutana Kennel, 1913
Phalonidia albipalpana Zeller, 1847
Phalonidia amasiana Ragonot, 1894
Phalonidia contractana Zeller, 1847
Phalonidia permixtana ([Denis & Schiffermüller], 1775)
Phaneta aspidiscana (Hübner, [1817])
Phaneta paetulana Kennel, 1901
Phaneta pauperana Duponchel, 1843
Phaneta tetraplana Möschler, 1866
Phiaris delitana Staudinger, 1879
Phiaris stibiana Guenée, 1845
Phiaris umbrosana Freyer, 1842
Phtheochroa imitana Derra, 1990
Phtheochroa larseni Huemer, 1990
Phtheochroa osthelderi Huemer, 1990
Phtheochroa schreieri Derra, 1990
Prochlidonia ochromixtana Kennel, 1913
Propiromorpha rhodophana Herrich-Schäffer, [1851]
Pseudamelia rogana Guenée, 1845
Pseudeulia asinana (Hübner, [1799])
Pseudococcyx tessulatana Staudinger, 1871
Pseudosciaphila branderiana (Linnaeus, 1758)
Ptycholoma lecheana (Linnaeus, 1758)
Rhopobota myrtillana Humpreys & Westwood, 1845
Rhopobota stagnana ([Denis & Schiffermüller], 1775)
Rhyacionia buoliana ([Denis & Schiffermüller], 1775)
Rhyacionia pinicolana Doubleday, 1850
Selania leplastriana Curtis, 1831
Siclobola micromys Stringer, 1929
Siclobola neglectana Herrich-Schäffer, [1851]
Siclobola pallidana (Fabricius, 1777)
Siclobola semialbana Guenée, 1845
Siclobola unifasciana Duponchel, 1843
Sparganothis pilleriana ([Denis & Schiffermüller], 1775)
Spilonota ocellana ([Denis & Schiffermüller], 1775)
Strophedra nitidana (Fabricius, 1794)
Strophedra weirana Douglas, 1850
Syndemis musculana (Hübner, [1799])
Thiodia anatoliana Kennel, 1916
Thiodia citrana (Hübner, [1799])
Thiodia fessana Mann, 1873
Tortricodes selma Koçak, 1991
Tortrix viridana Linnaeus, 1758
Trachysmia aureopunctana Ragonot, 1894
Trachysmia chalcantha Meyrick, 1912
Trachysmia decipiens Walsingham, 1900
Trachysmia duponchelana Duponchel, 1843
Trachysmia lucentana Kennel, 1899
Trachysmia palpana Ragonot, 1894
Trachysmia procerana Lederer, 1863
Trachysmia purana Guenée, 1846
Trachysmia thiana Staudinger, 1899
Trachysmia unionana Kennel, 1900

Pterophoridae
Adaina microdactyla (Hübner, [1813])
Agdistis adactyla (Hübner, [1819])
Agdistis caradjai Arenberger, 1975
Agdistis frankeniae Zeller, 1847
Agdistis heydeni Zeller, 1852
Agdistis mevlaniella Arenberger, 1972
Agdistis tamaricis Zeller, 1847
Amblyptilia acanthodactyla (Hübner, [1813])
Anacapperia fusca Hofmann, 1898
Anacapperia hellenica Adamczewski, 1951
Calyciphora homoiodactyla Kasy, 1960
Calyciphora nephelodactyla Eversmann, 1844
Calyciphora xanthodactyla Treitschke, 1833
Calyciphora xerodactyla Zeller, 1841
Capperia britanniodactyla Gregson, 1869
Capperia celeusi Frey, 1886
Capperia polonica Adamczewski, 1951
Capperia washbourni Adamczewski, 1951
Cnaemidophorus rhododactylus (Fabricius, 1787)
Emmelina monodactyla (Linnaeus, 1758)
Geina didactyla (Linnaeus, 1758)
Marasmarcha ehrenbergiana Zeller, 1841
Merrifieldia baliodactyla Zeller, 1841
Merrifieldia leucodactyla ([Denis & Schiffermüller], 1775)
Merrifieldia tridactyla (Linnaeus, 1758)
Oidematophorus lithodactylus Treitschke, 1833
Oxyptilus chrysodactylus ([Denis & Schiffermüller], 1775)
Oxyptilus distans Zeller, 1847
Oxyptilus ericetorum Stainton, 1851
Oxyptilus kollari Stainton, 1849
Oxyptilus marginellus Zeller, 1847
Oxyptilus parvidactylus Haworth, [1811]
Oxyptilus pilosellae Zeller, 1841
Oxyptilus propedistans Bigot & Picard, 1988
Paracapperia anatolica Caradja, 1920
Paraplatyptilia metzneri Zeller, 1841
Platyptilia calodactyla ([Denis & Schiffermüller], 1775)
Platyptilia capnodactyla Zeller, 1841
Platyptilia chondrodactyla Caradja, 1920
Platyptilia gonodactyla ([Denis & Schiffermüller], 1775)
Porittia galactodactyla ([Denis & Schiffermüller], 1775)
Procapperia maculata Constant, 1865
Pselnophorus borzhomi Zagulyaev, 1987
Pselnophorus heterodactylus (Müller, 1764)
Pterophorus calcarius Lederer, 1870
Pterophorus caspius Lederer, 1870
Pterophorus ivae Kasy, 1960
Pterophorus malacodactylus Zeller, 1847
Pterophorus pentadactylus (Linnaeus, 1758)
Pterophorus phlomidis Staudinger, 1870
Pterophorus subalternans Lederer, 1869
Stenoptilia bipunctidactyla Scopoli, 1763
Stenoptilia mannii Zeller, 1852
Stenoptilia pterodactyla (Linnaeus, 1761)
Stenoptilia stigmatodactyla Zeller, 1852
Stenoptilia zophodactyla Duponchel, 1838
Tabulaephorus parthicus Lederer, 1870
Tabulaephorus punctinervis Constant, 1885
Trichoptilus siceliota Zeller, 1847
Wheeleria spilodactyla Curtis, 1827

Carposinidae
Carposina berberidella Herrich-Schäffer, [1854]
Carposina scirrhosella Herrich-Schäffer, [1854]

Pyralidae
Abrephia compositella Treitschke, 1835
Acentria nivea Olivier, 1791
Achroia grisella (Fabricius, 1794)
Achyra nudalis (Hübner, 1796)
Acigona cicatricella (Hübner, [1824])
Acrobasis atrisquamella Ragonot, 1887
Acrobasis bithynella Zeller, 1848
Acrobasis centunculella Mann, 1859
Acrobasis consociella (Hübner, [1813])
Acrobasis glaucella Staudinger, 1859
Acrobasis obliqua Zeller, 1847
Acrobasis obtusella (Hübner, 1796)
Actenia beatalis Kalchberg, 1897
Actenia brunnealis Treitschke, 1829
Actenia honestalis Treitschke, 1829
Aeschremon disparalis Herrich-Schäffer, [1855]
Aglossa asiatica Erschoff, 1872
Aglossa caprealis (Hübner, [1809])
Aglossa pinguinalis (Linnaeus, 1758)
Agriphila asiatica Ganev & Hacker, 1984
Agriphila beieri Błeszyński, 1955
Agriphila bleszynskiella Amsel, 1961
Agriphila brionella Zerny, 1914
Agriphila deliella (Hübner, [1813])
Agriphila geniculea Haworth, [1811]
Agriphila inquinatella ([Denis & Schiffermüller], 1775)
Agriphila latistria Haworth, [1811]
Agriphila paleatella Zeller, 1847
Agriphila straminella ([Denis & Schiffermüller], 1775)
Agriphila tersella Lederer, 1855
Agriphila tolli Błeszyński, 1952
Agriphila trabeatella Herrich-Schäffer, [1848]
Agriphila tristella ([Denis & Schiffermüller], 1775)
Agriphiloides longipalpellus Bleszynki, 1965
Agrotera nemoralis Scopoli, 1763
Alisa amseli Ganev & Hacker, 1984
Alophia combustella Herrich-Schäffer, [1855]
Amaurophanes stigmosalis Herrich-Schäffer, [1848]
Anagasta cypriusella Roesler, 1965
Anagasta kuehniella Zeller, 1879
Anagasta welseriella Zeller, 1848
Anania funebris Ström, 1768
Anania verbascata (Fabricius, 1787)
Anarpia incertalis Duponchel, 1833
Ancylodes pallens Ragonot, 1887
Ancylodes straminella Christoph, 1877
Ancylolomia palpella ([Denis & Schiffermüller], 1775)
Ancylolomia pectinatella Zeller, 1847
Ancylolomia tentaculella (Hübner, 1796)
Ancylosis bichordella Ragonot, 1887
Ancylosis cinnamomella Duponchel, 1836
Ancylosis dumetella Ragonot, 1887
Ancylosis iranella Ragonot, 1887
Ancylosis maculifera Staudinger, 1870
Ancylosis ochricostella Ragonot, 1887
Ancylosis sareptella Herrich-Schäffer, 1860
Ancylosis turaniella Ragonot, 1887
Anerastia ablutella Zeller, 1839
Anerastia lotella (Hübner, [1813])
Angustalius malacellus Duponchel, 1836
Anhomoeosoma nimbellum Duponchel, 1836
Antigastra catalaunalis Duponchel, 1833
Aphomia sociella (Linnaeus, 1758)
Aporodes floralis (Hübner, [1809])
Aporodes nepticulalis Hofmann, [1898]
Aproceratia albunculella Staudinger, 1879
Arimania komaroffi Ragonot, 1888
Arsissa divaricella Ragonot, 1887
Arsissa miridella Ragonot, 1893
Arsissa ramosella Herrich-Schäffer, [1855]
Asalebria venustella Ragonot, 1887
Asarta ciliciella Staudinger, 1879
Assara turciella Roesler, 1973
Atralata albofascialis Treitschke, 1829
Bazaria gilvella Ragonot, 1887
Bazaria leuchochrella Herrich-Schäffer, [1855]
Bazaria turensis Ragonot, 1887
Bradyrrhoa cantenerella Duponchel, 1836
Bradyrrhoa confiniella Zeller, 1848
Bradyrrhoa gilveolella Treitschke, 1833
Bradyrrhoa mesobaphella Ragonot, 1888
Bradyrrhoa trapezella Duponchel, 1836
Cabotia lacteicostella Ragonot, 1887
Cabotia oblitella Zeller, 1848
Cadra abstersella Zeller, 1847
Cadra calidella Guenée, 1845
Cadra cautella Walker, 1863
Cadra delattinella Roesler, 1965
Cadra figulilella Gregson, 1871
Cadra furcatella Herrich-Schäffer, [1849]
Calamotropha hierichuntica Zeller, 1867
Calamotropha paludella (Hübner, [1824])
Cataclysta lemnata (Linnaeus, 1758)
Cataonia erubescens Christoph, 1877
Cataonia mauritanica Amsel, 1953
Catastia acraspedella Staudinger, 1879
Catastia marginea ([Denis & Schiffermüller], 1775)
Catoptria ciliciella Rebel, 1903
Catoptria colchicella Lederer, 1870
Catoptria confusella Staudinger, 1881
Catoptria dimorphella Staudinger, 1881
Catoptria falsella ([Denis & Schiffermüller], 1775)
Catoptria hilarella Caradja, 1925
Catoptria incertella Herrich-Schäffer, [1852]
Catoptria laevigatella Lederer, 1870
Catoptria lithargyrella (Hübner, 1796)
Catoptria mytilella (Hübner, [1805])
Catoptria pinella (Linnaeus, 1758)
Catoptria verella Zincken, 1817
Catoptria wolfi Ganev & Hacker, 1984
Chilo luteellus Motschulsky, 1866
Chilo phragmitellus (Hübner, [1810])
Chilo pulverosellus Ragonot, 1895
Chrysocrambus craterellus Scopoli, 1763
Chrysocrambus linetellus (Fabricius, 1781)
Chrysocrambus syriellus Zerny, 1934
Chrysoteuchia culmella (Linnaeus, 1758)
Conobathra celticola Staudinger, 1879
Conobathra tumidana ([Denis & Schiffermüller], 1775)
Corcyra cephalonica Stainton, 1866
Crambus lathoniellus Zincken, 1817
Crambus monochromellus Herrich-Schäffer, [1852]
Crambus pascuellus (Linnaeus, 1758)
Crambus perlellus Scopoli, 1763
Crambus pratellus (Linnaeus, 1758)
Crambus uliginosellus Zeller, 1850
Cryptoblabes gnidiella Milliere, 1867
Cybalomia lutosalis Mann, 1862
Cybalomia pentadalis Lederer, 1855
Cynaeda dentalis ([Denis & Schiffermüller], 1775)
Cynaeda gigantea Staudinger, 1880
Dattinia colchicalis Herrich-Schäffer, [1855]
Dattinia infulalis Lederer, 1858
Dattinia variabilis Zerny, 1930
Denticera divisella Duponchel, 1842
Diasemia litterata Scopoli, 1763
Diasemiopsis ramburialis Duponchel, 1834
Dioryctria abietella (Fabricius, 1787)
Dioryctria mendacella Staudinger, 1859
Dioryctria sylvestrella Ratzeburg, 1840
Dolicharthia punctalis ([Denis & Schiffermüller], 1775)
Donacaula mucronella ([Denis & Schiffermüller], 1775)
Duponchelia fovealis Zeller, 1847
Ebulea crocealis (Hübner, 1796)
Ebulea testacealis Zeller, 1847
Ecbatania holopyrrhella Ragonot, 1888
Eccopisa effractella Zeller, 1848
Ectomyelois ceratoniae Zeller, 1839
Elegia fallax Staudinger, 1881
Elophila affinialis Guenée, 1854
Elophila hederalis Amsel, 1935
Elophila nymphaeata (Linnaeus, 1758)
Ematheudes pseudopunctella Ragonot, 1888
Ematheudes punctella Treitschke, 1833
Ematheudes varicella Ragonot, 1887
Ematheudes vitellinella Ragonot, 1887
Emprepes vestalis Hampson, 1900
Endotricha flammealis ([Denis & Schiffermüller], 1775)
Epactoctena octogenalis Lederer, 1863
Epascestria peltaloides Rebel, 1932
Epascestria pustulalis (Hübner, [1823])
Ephelis cruentalis Geyer, 1832
Ephestia disparella Ragonot, 1901
Ephestia elutella (Hübner, 1796)
Epichalcia amasiella Roesler, 1969
Epidauria discella Hampson, 1901
Epidauria phoeniciella Ragonot, 1895
Epidauria strigosa Staudinger, 1879
Epidauria transversariella Zeller, 1848
Epiepischnia pseudolydella Amsel, 1953
Epilydia liturosella Erschoff, 1874
Epimetasia vestalis Ragonot, 1894
Epischidia caesariella Ragonot, 1901
Epischnia christophori Ragonot, 1887
Epischnia cretaciella Mann, 1969
Epischnia leucoloma Herrich-Schäffer, 1849
Epischnia leucomixtella Ragonot, 1887
Epischnia muscidella Ragonot, 1887
Epischnia prodromella (Hübner, [1799])
Epischnia stenopterella Rebel, 1910
Episcythrastis tetricella ([Denis & Schiffermüller], 1775)
Etiella zinckenella Treitschke, 1832
Eucarphia vinetella (Fabricius, 1787)
Euchromius anapiellus Zeller, 1847
Euchromius bellus (Hübner, 1796)
Euchromius bleszynskiellus Popescu-Gorj, 1964
Euchromius cochlearellus Amsel, 1949
Euchromius gratiosellus Caradja, 1910
Euchromius jaxartellus Erschoff, 1874
Euchromius keredjellus Amsel, 1949
Euchromius ocelleus Haworth, [1811]
Euchromius pulverosus Christoph, 1887
Euchromius rayatellus Amsel, 1949
Euchromius siuxellus Ganev & Hacker, 1986
Euchromius superbellus Zeller, 1849
Euchromius vinculellus Zeller, 1847
Euclasta splendidalis Herrich-Schäffer, [1848]
Eudonia angustea Curtis, 1827
Eudonia crataegella (Hübner, 1796)
Eudonia lineola Curtis, 1827
Eudonia mercurella (Linnaeus, 1758)
Eudonia obsoleta Staudinger, 1879
Eudonia polyphaealis Hampson, 1907
Eudonia truncicolella Stainton, 1849
Eurhobasis lutescentella Caradja, 1916
Eurhodope incompta Zeller, 1847
Eurhodope monogrammos Zeller, 1867
Eurhodope rosella Scopoli, 1763
Eurhodope sielmannella Roesler, 1969
Eurrhypara hortulata (Linnaeus, 1758)
Eurrhypis cacuminalis Eversmann, 1843
Eurrhypis pollinalis ([Denis & Schiffermüller], 1775)
Eurrhypis sartalis (Hübner, [1813])
Euzophera bigella Zeller, 1848
Euzophera cinerosella Zeller, 1839
Euzophera flagella Lederer, 1869
Euzophera imperfectella Ragonot, 1895
Euzophera luculentella Ragonot, 1888
Euzophera lunulella Costa, 1836
Euzophera osseatella Treitschke, 1832
Euzophera pinguis Haworth, [1811]
Euzophera pulchella Ragonot, 1887
Euzophera rubricetella Herrich-Schäffer, [1856]
Euzophera umbrosella Staudinger, 1879
Euzopherodes charlottae Rebel, 1914
Euzopherodes lutisignella Mann, 1869
Euzopherodes vapidella Mann, 1857
Evergestis aenealis ([Denis & Schiffermüller], 1775)
Evergestis blandalis Guenée, 1854
Evergestis boursini Amsel, 1938
Evergestis caesialis Herrich-Schäffer, [1855]
Evergestis desertalis (Hübner, [1813])
Evergestis extimalis Scopoli, 1763
Evergestis forficalis (Linnaeus, 1758)
Evergestis frumentalis (Linnaeus, 1761)
Evergestis infirmalis Staudinger, 1870
Evergestis isatidalis Duponchel, 1833
Evergestis limbata (Linnaeus, 1767)
Evergestis mundalis Guenée, 1854
Evergestis nomadalis Lederer, 1871
Evergestis pallidata (Hufnagel, 1767)
Evergestis politalis ([Denis & Schiffermüller], 1775)
Evergestis serratalis Staudinger, 1870
Evergestis sophialis (Fabricius, 1787)
Evergestis subfuscalis Staudinger, 1870
Evergestis umbrosalis F.R., [1842]
Exophora exaspersata Staudinger, 1879
Exophora florella Mann, 1862
Faveria dionysia Zeller, 1846
Galleria mellonella (Linnaeus, 1758)
Gesneria centuriella ([Denis & Schiffermüller], 1775)
Gnathogutta circumdatella Lederer, 1858
Gnathogutta luticornella Ragonot, 1887
Gnathogutta osseella Ragonot, 1887
Gnathogutta pluripunctella Ragonot, 1887
Gnathogutta pumicosa Lederer, 1855
Gnathogutta umbratella Treitschke, 1835
Gymnancyla canella ([Denis & Schiffermüller], 1775)
Hannemanneia tacapella Ragonot, 1887
Harpadispar diffusalis Guenée, 1854
Heliothela wulfeniana Scopoli, 1763
Hellula undalis (Fabricius, 1781)
Heosphora ramulosella Ragonot, 1895
Heterographis albicosta Staudinger, 1870
Heterographis candidatella Lederer, 1858
Heterographis cinerella Stainton, 1859
Heterographis faustinella Zeller, 1867
Heterographis geminella Amsel, 1961
Heterographis gracilella Ragonot, 1887
Heterographis harmoniella Ragonot, 1887
Heterographis hellenica Staudinger, 1870
Heterographis muliebris Meyrick, 1937
Heterographis nigripunctella Staudinger, 1879
Heterographis nubeculella Ragonot, 1887
Heterographis pallida Staudinger, 1870
Heterographis pectinatella Ragonot, 1887
Heterographis pyrethrella Herrich-Schäffer, 1860
Heterographis rhodochrella Herrich-Schäffer, 1852
Heterographis samaritanella Zeller, 1867
Heterographis xylinella Staudinger, 1870
Homoeosoma achroeellum Ragonot, 1887
Homoeosoma calcellum Ragonot, 1887
Homoeosoma inustellum Ragonot, 1884
Homoeosoma sinuellum (Fabricius, 1794)
Homoeosoma subalbatellum Mann, 1864
Hydriris ornatalis Duponchel, 1834
Hymenia fascialis Cramer, [1782]
Hyperlais dulcinalis Treitschke, 1835
Hyperlais nemausalis Duponchel, 1834
Hyperlais siccalis Guenée, 1854
Hypochalcia ahenella ([Denis & Schiffermüller], 1775)
Hypochalcia fasciatella Staudinger, 1881
Hypochalcia germanella Zincken, 1818
Hypotia corticalis ([Denis & Schiffermüller], 1775)
Hypsopygia costalis (Fabricius, 1775)
Hypsotropa ichorella Lederer, 1855
Hypsotropa limbella Zeller, 1848
Hypsotropa paucipunctella Ragonot, 1895
Hypsotropa syriacella Ragonot, 1888
Hypsotropa vulneratella Zeller, 1847
Isauria dilucidella Duponchel, 1836
Keradere lepidella Ragonot, 1887
Keradere noctivaga Staudinger, 1879
Lambaesia fumosella Ragonot, 1887
Lambaesia pistrinariella Ragonot, 1887
Lambaesia straminella Zerny, 1914
Lamoria anella ([Denis & Schiffermüller], 1775)
Lamoria ruficostella Ragonot, 1888
Loxostege aeruginalis (Hübner, 1796)
Loxostege comptalis Freyer, [1848]
Loxostege deliblatica Szent-Ivany & Uhrik-Meszaros, 1942
Loxostege flavivenalis Hampson, 1913
Loxostege mucosalis Herrich-Schäffer, [1848]
Loxostege straminealis Hampson, 1900
Loxostege turbidalis Treitschke, 1829
Loxostege wagneri Zerny, 1929
Mardinia ferrealis Hampson, 1900
Margaritia sticticalis (Linnaeus, 1761)
Mecyna amasialis Staudinger, 1880
Mecyna asinalis (Hübner, [1819])
Mecyna flavalis ([Denis & Schiffermüller], 1775)
Mecyna lutealis Duponchel, 1833
Mecyna lutulentalis Lederer, 1858
Mecyna pontica Staudinger, 1880
Mecyna trinalis ([Denis & Schiffermüller], 1775)
Megasis libanoticella Zerny, 1934
Megasis mimeticella Staudinger, 1879
Megasis rippertella Zeller, 1839
Melissoblaptes unicolor Staudinger, 1879
Melissoblaptes zelleri de Joannis, 1932
Merulempista cingillella Zeller, 1846
Mesocrambus candidellus Herrich-Schäffer, [1848]
Metacrambus carectellus Zeller, 1847
Metallosticha argyrogrammos Zeller, 1847
Metallostichodes nigrocyanella Constant, 1865
Metallostichodes vinaceella Ragonot, 1895
Metasia carnealis Treitschke, 1829
Metasia inustalis Ragonot, 1894
Metasia mendicalis Staudinger, 1880
Metasia ophialis Treitschke, 1829
Metasia rosealis Ragonot, 1895
Metasia subtilialis Caradja, 1916
Metasia suppandalis (Hübner, [1823])
Metasia virginalis Ragonot, 1894
Microstega hyalinalis (Hübner, 1796)
Microstega pandalis (Hübner, [1825])
Microstega praepetalis Lederer, 1869
Mutuuraia terrealis Treitschke, 1829
Myelois circumvoluta Geoffroy, 1785
Myelois cribratella Zeller, 1847
Myelois fuscicostella Mann, 1861
Myelois multiforella Ragonot, 1893
Myelois quadripunctella Zerny, 1914
Myelopsis tabidella Mann, 1864
Myrlaea albistrigata Staudinger, 1881
Myrlaea epischniella Staudinger, 1879
Nascia cilialis (Hübner, 1796)
Neocrambus wolfschlaegeri Schawerda, 1937
Nephopteryx alpigenella Duponchel, 1836
Nephopteryx gregella Eversmann, 1844
Nephopteryx hostilis Stephens, 1834
Nephopteryx impariella Ragonot, 1887
Nephopteryx insignella Mann, 1862
Nephopteryx melanotaeniella Ragonot, 1888
Nephopteryx rhenella Zincken, 1818
Nephopteryx serraticornella Zeller, 1839
Noctuelia escherichi Hofmann, [1898]
Noctuelia mardinalis Staudinger, 1892
Noctuelia superba Freyer, [1844]
Noctuelia vespertalis Herrich-Schäffer, [1855]
Nomophila noctuella ([Denis & Schiffermüller], 1775)
Nyctegretis achatinella (Hübner, [1824])
Nyctegretis ruminella Harpe, 1860
Nyctegretis triangulella Ragonot, 1901
Nymphula stagnata Donovan, 1806
Nymphula stratiotata (Linnaeus, 1758)
Oncocera combustella Herrich-Schäffer, [1852]
Opsibotys fuscalis ([Denis & Schiffermüller], 1775)
Orenaia alborivulalis Eversmann, 1844
Orthopygia almanalis Rebel, 1917
Orthopygia fulvocilialis Duponchel, 1832
Orthopygia glaucinalis (Linnaeus, 1758)
Orthopygia incarnatalis Zeller, 1847
Orthopygia rubidalis ([Denis & Schiffermüller], 1775)
Ostrinia nubilalis (Hübner, 1796)
Palmitia massilialis Duponchel, 1832
Palpita unionalis (Hübner, 1796)
Panstegia aerealis (Hübner, 1796)
Panstegia limbopunctalis Herrich-Schäffer, [1849]
Panstegia meciti Koçak, 1987
Paracorsia repandalis ([Denis & Schiffermüller], 1775)
Paralipsa gularis Zeller, 1877
Paramaxillaria meretrix Staudinger, 1879
Parastenia bruguieralis Duponchel, 1833
Paratalanta cultralis Staudinger, 1867
Pareromene euchromiella Ragonot, 1895
Pediasia aridella Thunberg, 1788
Pediasia aridelloides Bleszynki, 1965
Pediasia contaminella (Hübner, 1796)
Pediasia desertella Lederer, 1855
Pediasia fascelinella (Hübner, [1813])
Pediasia luteella ([Denis & Schiffermüller], 1775)
Pediasia matricella Treitschke, 1832
Pediasia persella Toll, 1947
Pediasia phrygius Fazekas, 1990
Pempelia albariella Zeller, 1846
Pempelia amoenella Zeller, 1848
Pempelia argillaceella Osthelder, 1935
Pempelia brephiella Staudinger, 1879
Pempelia cirtensis Ragonot, 1890
Pempelia formosa Haworth, [1811]
Pempelia johannella (Caradja, 1916)
Pempelia obductella Zeller, 1839
Pempelia obscurella Osthelder, 1935
Pempelia palumbella ([Denis & Schiffermüller], 1775)
Pempelia placidella Zerny, 1929
Pempelia romanoffiella Ragonot, 1887
Pempelia serratella Ragonot, 1893
Pempelia sordida Staudinger, 1879
Pempelia thymiella Zeller, 1846
Pempeliella ornatella ([Denis & Schiffermüller], 1775)
Pempeliella sororiella Zeller, 1839
Phlyctaenia coronata (Hufnagel, 1767)
Phlyctaenia perlucidalis (Hübner, [1809])
Phlyctaenomorpha sinuosalis Cerf, 1910
Phycita coronatella Guenée, 1845
Phycita kurdistanella Amsel, 1953
Phycita macrodontella Ragonot, 1887
Phycita meliella Mann, 1864
Phycita metzneri Zeller, 1846
Phycita pedisignella Ragonot, 1887
Phycita poteriella Zeller, 1846
Phycita strigata Staudinger, 1879
Phycitodes albatella Ragonot, 1887
Phycitodes binaevella (Hübner, [1813])
Phycitodes carlinella Heinemann, 1865
Phycitodes inquinatella Ragonot, 1887
Phycitodes lacteella Rothschild, 1915
Phycitodes nigrilimbella Ragonot, 1887
Phycitodes saxicola Vaugham, 1870
Pima boisduvaliella Guenée, 1845
Platytes cerussella ([Denis & Schiffermüller], 1775)
Pleuroptya balteata (Fabricius, 1798)
Pleuroptya ruralis Scopoli, 1763
Plodia interpunctella (Hübner, [1813])
Pollichia semirubella Scopoli, 1763
Polyocha cremoricosta Ragonot, 1895
Polyocha venosa Zeller, 1847
Praeepischnia lydella Lederer, 1865
Pristocerella solskyi Christoph, 1877
Prochoristis rupicapralis Lederer, 1855
Prophtasia platycerella Ragonot, 1887
Psammotis pulveralis (Hübner, 1796)
Psorosa albunculella Ragonot, 1901
Psorosa dahliella Treitschke, 1832
Psorosa maraschella Caradja, 1910
Psorosa nucleolella Möschler, 1866
Psorosa ochrifasciella Ragonot, 1887
Pterothrixidia ancyrensis Amsel, 1953
Pterothrixidia contectella Zeller, 1848
Pterothrixidia fimbriatella Zeller, 1848
Pterothrixidia impurella Duponchel, 1836
Pterothrixidia orientella Ragonot, 1893
Pterothrixidia rufella Duponchel, 1836
Pterothrixidia tauricella Wocke, 1871
Pyla fusca Haworth, [1811]
Pyralis farinalis Linnaeus, 1758
Pyralis imperialis Caradja, 1916
Pyralis perversalis Herrich-Schäffer, 1849
Pyralis regalis ([Denis & Schiffermüller], 1775)
Pyrasia gutturalis Staudinger, 1880
Pyrausta alborivularis Eversmann, 1843
Pyrausta amatalis Rebel, 1903
Pyrausta aurata Scopoli, 1763
Pyrausta biternalis Mann, 1862
Pyrausta castalis Treitschke, 1829
Pyrausta cingulata (Linnaeus, 1758)
Pyrausta cuprinalis Ragonot, 1895
Pyrausta despicata Scopoli, 1763
Pyrausta falcatalis Guenée, 1854
Pyrausta nigrata Scopoli, 1763
Pyrausta obfuscata Scopoli, 1763
Pyrausta pachyceralis Hampson, 1900
Pyrausta pauperalis Staudinger, 1880
Pyrausta pavidalis Zerny, 1935
Pyrausta purpuralis (Linnaeus, 1758)
Pyrausta sanguinalis (Linnaeus, 1767)
Pyrausta trimaculalis Staudinger, 1867
Pyrausta virginalis Duponchel, 1833
Pyrausta zeitunalis Caradja, 1916
Saluria chehirella Zerny, 1929
Saluria maculivittella Ragonot, 1887
Schoenobius alpherakyi Staudinger, 1874
Schoenobius forficellus Thunberg, 1794
Schoenobius gigantellus ([Denis & Schiffermüller], 1775)
Schoenobius niloticus Zeller, 1867
Scirpophaga praelata Scopoli, 1763
Sclerocona acutellus Eversmann, 1842
Scoparia ambigualis Treitschke, 1829
Scoparia anatolica Caradja, 1917
Scoparia basistrigalis Knaggs, 1866
Scoparia ingratella Zeller, 1846
Scoparia luteolalis Scopoli, 1772
Scoparia perplexella Zeller, 1839
Scoparia pyralea Haworth, [1811]
Sefidia clasperella Asselbergs, 1994
Selagia dissimilella Ragonot, 1887
Selagia spadicella (Hübner, 1796)
Selagia subochrella (Herrich-Schäffer, 1849)
Sitochroa concoloralis Lederer, 1857
Sitochroa palealis ([Denis & Schiffermüller], 1775)
Sitochroa verticalis (Linnaeus, 1758)
Spermatophthora hornigii Lederer, 1852
Staudingeria deserticola Staudinger, 1870
Staudingeria morbosella Staudinger, 1879
Stemmatophora caesarealis Ragonot, 1891
Stemmatophora combustalis F.R., [1842]
Stemmatophora subustalis Lederer, 1853
Stiphrometasia sancta Hampson, 1900
Sultania lophotalis Hampson, 1900
Surattha margherita Bleszynki, 1965
Susia uberalis Swinhoe, 1884
Synaphe armenialis Lederer, 1870
Synaphe asiatica Obraztsov, 1952
Synaphe berytalis Ragonot, 1888
Synaphe bombycalis ([Denis & Schiffermüller], 1775)
Synaphe connectalis (Hübner, 1796)
Synaphe consecretalis Lederer, 1855
Synaphe moldavica (Esper, [1789])
Synaphe morbidalis Guenée, 1854
Synaphe punctalis (Fabricius, 1775)
Synaphe syriaca Rebel, 1903
Synaphe uxorialis Lederer, 1858
Synclera traducalis Zeller, 1852
Synoria antiquella Herrich-Schäffer, [1855]
Syrianarpia osthelderi Leraut, 1982
Talis quercella ([Denis & Schiffermüller], 1775)
Talis renatae Ganev & Hacker, 1984
Tegostoma baphialis Lederer, 1868
Tegostoma comparalis (Hübner, 1796)
Tegostoma perlepidalis Guenée, 1854
Tegostoma ramalis (Hübner, 1796)
Therapne obsoletalis Mann, 1864
Thisanotia chrysonuchella Scopoli, 1763
Thopeutis galleriellus Ragonot, 1892
Thyridiphora furia Swinhoe, 1884
Titanio normalis (Hübner, 1796)
Titanio sericatalis Herrich-Schäffer, [1848]
Titanio venustalis Lederer, 1855
Trachycera advenella Zincken, 1818
Trachycera dulcella Zeller, 1848
Trachycera legatea Haworth, [1811]
Trachycera marmorea Haworth, [1811]
Trachycera niveicinctella Ragonot, 1887
Trachycera suavella Zincken, 1818
Tragonitis cristella (Hübner, 1796)
Tretopteryx pertusalis Geyer, [1832]
Udea albescenstalis Hampson, 1900
Udea dispunctalis Guenée, 1854
Udea ferrugalis (Hübner, 1796)
Udea fimbriatalis Duponchel, 1834
Udea fulvalis (Hübner, [1809])
Udea institalis (Hübner, [1819])
Udea languidalis Eversmann, 1842
Udea lutealis (Hübner, [1809])
Udea numeralis (Hübner, 1796)
Udea olivalis ([Denis & Schiffermüller], 1775)
Udea rhododendronalis Duponchel, 1834
Udea silvalis de Joannis, 1891
Udea vestalis Hampson, 1900
Ulotricha egregialis Herrich-Schäffer, 1838
Uresiphita limbalis ([Denis & Schiffermüller], 1775)
Xanthocrambus saxonellus Zincken, 1821
Zophodia grossulariella Zincken, 1818
Zophodiodes leucocostella Ragonot, 1887

Thyridae
Thyris fenestrella Scopoli, 1763

Lasiocampidae
Chilena sordida Erschoff, 1874
Chondrostega osthelderi Püngeler, 1925
Chondrostega pastrana Lederer, 1858
Dendrolimus pini (Linnaeus, 1758)
Eriogaster catax (Linnaeus, 1758)
Eriogaster czipkai Lajonquiere, 1975
Eriogaster lanestris (Linnaeus, 1758)
Eriogaster nippei Freina, 1988
Eriogaster pfeifferi Daniel, 1932
Eriogaster rimicola Schrank, 1802
Euthrix potatoria (Linnaeus, 1758)
Gastropacha populifolia (Esper, [1783])
Gastropacha quercifolia (Linnaeus, 1758)
Lasiocampa eversmanni Kindermann, 1843
Lasiocampa grandis Rogenhofer, 1891
Lasiocampa quercus (Linnaeus, 1758)
Lasiocampa trifolii ([Denis & Schiffermüller], 1775)
Macrothylacia rubi (Linnaeus, 1758)
Malacosoma alpicolum Staudinger, 1870
Malacosoma castrensis (Linnaeus, 1758)
Malacosoma franconicum ([Denis & Schiffermüller], 1775)
Malacosoma neustrium (Linnaeus, 1758)
Malacosoma paralellum Staudinger, 1887
Odonestis pruni (Linnaeus, 1758)
Pachypasa otus Drury, 1773
Phyllodesma tremulifolia (Hübner, [1810])
Poecilocampa alpina Frey & Wullschlegel, 1874
Sena proxima Staudinger, 1894
Trichiura crataegi (Linnaeus, 1758)
Trichiura verenae Witt, 1981

Bombycidae
Bombyx mori (Linnaeus, 1758)

Lemoniidae
Lemonia balcanica Herrich-Schäffer, [1843]
Lemonia ballioni Christoph, 1888
Lemonia dumi (Linnaeus, 1761)
Lemonia pauli Staudinger, 1894
Lemonia pia Püngeler, 1902
Lemonia syriensis Daniel, 1953

Endromidae
Endromis versicolora (Linnaeus, 1758)

Saturniidae
Neoris huttoni Moore, 1862
Pavonia cephalariae Romanoff, 1885
Pavonia pavonia (Linnaeus, 1758)
Pavonia spini ([Denis & Schiffermüller], 1775)
Perisomena caecigena Kupido, 1825
Saturnia pyri ([Denis & Schiffermüller], 1775)

Brahmaeidae
Brahmaea ledereri Rogenhofer, 1873

Geometridae
Abraxas grossulariatus (Linnaeus, 1758)
Agriopis ankeraria Staudinger, 1861
Agriopis aurantiaria (Hübner, [1799])
Agriopis brumaria Borkhausen, 1794
Agriopis marginaria (Fabricius, 1777)
Agriopis vittaria Sulzer, 1776
Alcis repandatus (Linnaeus, 1758)
Aleucis distinctata Herrich-Schäffer, [1839]
Aleucis mimetes Wehrli, 1932
Aleucis orientalis Staudinger, 1892
Alsophila ligustriaria Lang, 1789
Amorphogynia necessaria Zeller, 1849
Angerona prunaria (Linnaeus, 1758)
Anticlea badiata Lang, 1789
Anticlea derivata ([Denis & Schiffermüller], 1775)
Antonechloris smaragdaria (Fabricius, 1787)
Apeira syringaria (Linnaeus, 1758)
Aplasta ononaria Fuessly, 1783
Aplocera annexata Freyer, [1830]
Aplocera columbata Metzner, 1845
Aplocera dervenaria Mentzer, 1981
Aplocera efformata Guenée, 1857
Aplocera fraternata Herrich-Schäffer, 1861
Aplocera fraudulentata Herrich-Schäffer, 1861
Aplocera guneyi Riemis, 1992
Aplocera mundata Staudinger, 1892
Aplocera mundulata Guenée, 1857
Aplocera musculata Staudinger, 1892
Aplocera numidaria Herrich-Schäffer, [1852]
Aplocera obsitaria Lederer, 1853
Aplocera opificata Lederer, 1870
Aplocera plagiata (Linnaeus, 1758)
Aplocera simpliciata Treitschke, 1835
Aplocera uniformata Urbahn, 1971
Apocheima hispidarium ([Denis & Schiffermüller], 1775)
Apochima flabellaria Heeger, 1838
Apochima rjabovi Wehrli, 1936
Archiearis notha (Hübner, [1823])
Artiora evonymaria (Hübner, [1799])
Ascotis turcaria (Fabricius, 1775)
Asovia maeoticaria Alphéraky, 1876
Aspitates ochrearia Rossi, 1794
Aspitates quadripunctata Goeze, 1781
Asthena albulata (Hufnagel, 1767)
Biston achyrus Wehrli, 1936
Biston betularius (Linnaeus, 1758)
Biston stratarius (Hufnagel, 1767)
Boarmia roboraria (Fabricius, 1787)
Boarmia viertlii Bohatsch, 1883
Bupalus piniarius (Linnaeus, 1758)
Cabera pusaria (Linnaeus, 1758)
Calodyscia sicanaria Oberthür, 1923
Calospilos pantaria (Linnaeus, 1767)
Calospilos sylvata Scopoli, 1763
Campaea honoraria ([Denis & Schiffermüller], 1775)
Campaea margaritata (Linnaeus, 1767)
Camptogramma bilineata (Linnaeus, 1758)
Camptogramma grisescens Staudinger, 1892
Carsia lythoxylata (Hübner, [1799])
Casilda antophilaria (Hübner, [1813])
Cataclysme riguata (Hübner, [1823])
Catarhoe cuculata (Hufnagel, 1767)
Catarhoe cupreata Herrich-Schäffer, 1839
Catarhoe permixtaria Guenée, 1857
Catarhoe putridaria Herrich-Schäffer, [1852]
Catarhoe rubidata ([Denis & Schiffermüller], 1775)
Chemerina caliginearia Rambur, 1833
Chesias korbi Bohatsch, 1909
Chesias rufata (Fabricius, 1775)
Chesias sureyata Rebel, 1931
Chlorissa asphaleia Wiltshire, 1966
Chlorissa pretiosaria Staudinger, 1877
Chlorissa pulmentaria Guenée, 1857
Chlorissa viridata (Linnaeus, 1758)
Chloroclysta miata (Linnaeus, 1758)
Chloroclysta siterata (Hufnagel, 1767)
Chloroclysta truncata (Hufnagel, 1767)
Chloroclystis chloerata Mabille, 1870
Chloroclystis rectangulata (Linnaeus, 1758)
Chloroclystis v-ata Haworth, [1809]
Chrysocraspeda charites Oberthür, 1916
Cidaria fulvata Forster, 1771
Cinglis humifusaria Eversmann, 1837
Cleora cinctaria ([Denis & Schiffermüller], 1775)
Cleorodes lichenarius (Hufnagel, 1767)
Cleta filacearia Herrich-Schäffer, [1847]
Cleta perpusillaria Eversmann, 1847
Cleta ramosaria Villers, 1789
Cnestrognophos anthina Wehrli, 1953
Cnestrognophos libanoticus Wehrli, 1931
Cnestrognophos mutilatus Staudinger, 1879
Colostygia olivata ([Denis & Schiffermüller], 1775)
Colostygia pectinataria Knoch, 1781
Colostygia schneideraria Lederer, 1855
Colotois pennaria (Linnaeus, 1761)
Comibaena bajularia ([Denis & Schiffermüller], 1775)
Comibaena neriaria Herrich-Schäffer, [1852]
Cosmorhoe ocellata (Linnaeus, 1758)
Costaconvexa polygrammata Borkhausen, 1794
Crocallis elinguaria (Linnaeus, 1758)
Crocallis inexpectata Warnecke, 1940
Crocallis tusciaria Borkhausen, 1793
Culpinia prouti Thierry-Mieg, 1913
Cyclophora albiocellaria (Hübner, 1822)
Cyclophora annulata (Schulze, 1775)
Cyclophora linearia (Hübner, [1799])
Cyclophora porata (Linnaeus, 1767)
Cyclophora punctaria (Linnaeus, 1758)
Cyclophora puppillaria (Hübner, [1799])
Cyclophora quercimontanaria Bastelberger, 1897
Cyclophora ruficiliaria Herrich-Schäffer, [1855]
Cyclophora suppunctaria Zeller, 1847
Dasycorsa modesta Staudinger, 1879
Dicrognophos amanensis Wehrli, 1934
Dicrognophos pseudosnelleni Rjabov, 1964
Dicrognophos sartatus Treitschke, 1827
Discoloxia blomeri Curtis, 1832
Dyscia conspersaria ([Denis & Schiffermüller], 1775)
Dyscia lentiscaria Donzel, 1837
Dyscia sultanica Wehrli, 1936
Ecliptopera silaceata ([Denis & Schiffermüller], 1775)
Ectropis bistortata Goeze, 1781
Ectropis consonaria (Hübner, [1799])
Eilicrinia acardia Stichel, 1911
Eilicrinia cordiaria (Hübner, 1790)
Eilicrinia subcordiaria Herrich-Schäffer, [1852]
Eilicrinia trinotata Metzner, 1845
Ematurga atomaria (Linnaeus, 1758)
Enanthyperythra legataria Herrich-Schäffer, [1852]
Ennomos autumnaria Werneburg, 1859
Ennomos effractaria Freyer, [1842]
Ennomos erosaria (Hübner, 1790)
Ennomos fraxineti Wiltshire, 1947
Ennomos quercaria (Hübner, [1813])
Ennomos quercinaria (Hufnagel, 1767)
Entephria caesiata ([Denis & Schiffermüller], 1775)
Entephria ignorata Staudinger, 1892
Epilobophora sabinata Geyer, [1831]
Epione paralellaria ([Denis & Schiffermüller], 1775)
Epione repandaria (Hufnagel, 1767)
Epirrhoe alternata (Müller, 1764)
Epirrhoe galiata ([Denis & Schiffermüller], 1775)
Epirrhoe molluginata (Hübner, [1813])
Epirrhoe rivata (Hübner, [1813])
Epirrhoe tristata (Linnaeus, 1758)
Epirrita nebulata Borgstroem, 1784
Erannis declinans Staudinger, 1879
Erannis defoliaria (Linnaeus, 1761)
Euchoeca nebulata Scopoli, 1763
Euchrognophos dubitarius Staudinger, 1892
Euchrognophos nanodes Wehrli, 1936
Euchrognophos variegatus Duponchel, 1830
Eucrostes indigenata Villers, 1789
Eulithis prunata (Linnaeus, 1758)
Eulithis roessleraria Staudinger, 1871
Eumannia oppositaria Mann, 1864
Eumera hoeferi Wehrli, 1934
Eumera regina Staudinger, 1892
Eumera turcosyrica Wehrli, 1932
Eunychiodes amygdalaria Herrich-Schäffer, [1848]
Eunychiodes divergaria Staudinger, 1892
Eunychiodes variabila Brandt, 1938
Euphya biangulata Haworth, [1809]
Euphya chalusata Wiltshire, 1970
Euphya frustata Treitschke, 1828
Euphya sintenisi Staudinger, 1892
Eupithecia abietaria Goeze, 1781
Eupithecia achyrdaghica Wehrli, 1929
Eupithecia adscriptaria Staudinger, 1871
Eupithecia albosparsata de Joannis, 1891
Eupithecia alliaria Staudinger, 1870
Eupithecia amasina Bohatsch, 1893
Eupithecia arenbergeri Pinker, 1976
Eupithecia bastelbergeri Dietze, 1913
Eupithecia breviculata Donzel, 1837
Eupithecia brunneata Staudinger, 1900
Eupithecia buxata Pinker, 1958
Eupithecia calligraphata Wagner, 1929
Eupithecia centaureata ([Denis & Schiffermüller], 1775)
Eupithecia cerussaria Lederer, 1855
Eupithecia cuculliaria Rebel, 1901
Eupithecia denotata (Hübner, [1813])
Eupithecia denticulata Treitschke, 1828
Eupithecia distinctaria Herrich-Schäffer, [1848]
Eupithecia euxinata Bohatsch, 1893
Eupithecia expallidata Doubleday, 1856
Eupithecia extraversaria Herrich-Schäffer, [1852]
Eupithecia extremata (Fabricius, 1787)
Eupithecia furcata Staudinger, 1879
Eupithecia gemellata Herrich-Schäffer, 1861
Eupithecia graphata Treitschke, 1828
Eupithecia gratiosata Herrich-Schäffer, 1861
Eupithecia gueneata Mabille, 1862
Eupithecia haworthiata Doubleday, 1856
Eupithecia icterata Villers, 1789
Eupithecia impurata (Hübner, [1813])
Eupithecia inconspicuata Bohatsch, 1893
Eupithecia indigata (Hübner, [1813])
Eupithecia innotata (Hufnagel, 1767)
Eupithecia insigniata (Hübner, 1790)
Eupithecia intricata Zetterstedt, [1839]
Eupithecia irriguata (Hübner, [1813])
Eupithecia irritaria Staudinger, 1892
Eupithecia korvaci Prout, 1939
Eupithecia kunzi Pinker, 1976
Eupithecia lacteolata Dietze, 1906
Eupithecia laquaearia Herrich-Schäffer, [1848]
Eupithecia limbata Staudinger, 1879
Eupithecia linariata (Fabricius, 1787)
Eupithecia lutosaria Bohatsch, 1893
Eupithecia maeoticaria Bohatsch, 1893
Eupithecia marasa Wehrli, 1932
Eupithecia marginata Staudinger, 1892
Eupithecia mesogrammata Dietze, 1910
Eupithecia millefoliata Roesler, 1866
Eupithecia nigritaria Staudinger, 1879
Eupithecia novata Dietze, 1903
Eupithecia ochridata Pinker, 1968
Eupithecia ochrovittata Christoph, 1887
Eupithecia oxycedrata Rambur, 1833
Eupithecia pfeifferi Wehrli, 1929
Eupithecia pinkeri Mironov, 1991
Eupithecia plumbeolata Haworth, [1809]
Eupithecia pseudocastigata Pinker, 1976
Eupithecia pulchellata Stephens, 1831
Eupithecia pusillata (Fabricius, 1787)
Eupithecia quercetica Prout, 1938
Eupithecia reisserata Pinker, 1976
Eupithecia saueri Vojnits, 1978
Eupithecia scalptata Christoph, 1885
Eupithecia schiefereri Bohatsch, 1893
Eupithecia scopariata Rambur, 1833
Eupithecia semigraphata Bruand, [1847]
Eupithecia separata Staudinger, 1879
Eupithecia silenata Assman, 1849
Eupithecia silenicolata Mabille, 1867
Eupithecia simpliciata Haworth, [1809]
Eupithecia spadiceata Zerny, 1933
Eupithecia spissilineata Metzner, 1846
Eupithecia staudingeri Bohatsch, 1893
Eupithecia subfenestrata Staudinger, 1892
Eupithecia subfuscata Haworth, [1809]
Eupithecia subsequaria Herrich-Schäffer, [1852]
Eupithecia subumbrata ([Denis & Schiffermüller], 1775)
Eupithecia succenturiata (Linnaeus, 1758)
Eupithecia syriacata Staudinger, 1879
Eupithecia tantillaria Boisduval, 1840
Eupithecia terrenata Dietze, 1913
Eupithecia tripunctaria Herrich-Schäffer, [1852]
Eupithecia undata Freyer, [1840]
Eupithecia unedonata Mabille, 1868
Eupithecia variostrigata Alphéraky, 1876
Eupithecia venosata (Fabricius, 1787)
Eupithecia vulgata Haworth, [1809]
Eupithecia wehrlii Wagner, 1931
Eustroma mardinata Staudinger, 1895
Fritzwagneria waltheri Wagner, 1919
Geometra papilionaria (Linnaeus, 1758)
Glossotrophia confinaria Herrich-Schäffer, [1847]
Glossotrophia diffinaria Prout, 1913
Gnopharmia colchidaria Lederer, 1870
Gnopharmia objectaria Staudinger, 1892
Gnopharmia rubraria Staudinger, 1892
Gymnoscelis dearmata (Dietze, 1904)
Gymnoscelis rufifasciata Haworth, [1809]
Gypsochroa renitidata (Hübner, [1817])
Hemistola chrysoprasaria (Esper, [1794])
Hemithea aestivaria (Hübner, [1799])
Heterolocha laminaria Herrich-Schäffer, [1852]
Hierochthonia pulverata Warren, 1901
Horisme corticata Treitschke, 1835
Horisme tersata ([Denis & Schiffermüller], 1775)
Horisme vitalbata (Hübner, [1799])
Hydria cervinalis Scopoli, 1763
Hydria undulata (Linnaeus, 1758)
Hydriomena coerulata (Fabricius, 1777)
Hydriomena furcata Thunberg, 1784
Hydriomena ruberata Freyer, [1831]
Hylaea cedricola Wehrli, 1929
Hylaea fasciaria (Linnaeus, 1758)
Hylaea pinicolaria Bellier, 1861
Hypoxystis pluviaria (Fabricius, 1787)
Idaea affinitata Bang-Haas, 1907
Idaea albitorquata Püngeler, 1907
Idaea allongata Staudinger, 1898
Idaea antennata Wehrli, 1931
Idaea aureolaria ([Denis & Schiffermüller], 1775)
Idaea aversata (Linnaeus, 1758)
Idaea biselata (Hufnagel, 1767)
Idaea camparia Herrich-Schäffer, [1852]
Idaea cervantaria Millire, 1869
Idaea circuitaria (Hübner, [1819])
Idaea congruata Zeller, 1847
Idaea consanguinaria Lederer, 1853
Idaea consociata Staudinger, 1900
Idaea consolidata Lederer, 1853
Idaea degeneraria (Hübner, [1799])
Idaea determinata Staudinger, 1876
Idaea deversaria Herrich-Schäffer, [1847]
Idaea dilutaria (Hübner, [1799])
Idaea dimidiata (Hufnagel, 1767)
Idaea efflorata Zeller, 1849
Idaea elongaria Rambur, 1833
Idaea emarginata (Linnaeus, 1758)
Idaea fasciata Staudinger, 1892
Idaea fathmaria Oberthür, 1876
Idaea filicata (Hübner, [1799])
Idaea flaveolaria (Hübner, [1809])
Idaea fuscovenosa Goeze, 1781
Idaea gracilipennis Warren, 1901
Idaea holliata Homberg, 1909
Idaea humiliata (Hufnagel, 1767)
Idaea infirmaria Rambur, 1833
Idaea inquinata Scopoli, 1763
Idaea intermedia Staudinger, 1879
Idaea laevigata Scopoli, 1763
Idaea mediaria (Hübner, [1819])
Idaea metohiensis Rebel, 1900
Idaea moniliata ([Denis & Schiffermüller], 1775)
Idaea murinata (Hufnagel, 1767)
Idaea nitidata Herrich-Schäffer, 1861
Idaea obsoletaria Rambur, 1833
Idaea ochrata Scopoli, 1763
Idaea ossiculata Lederer, 1871
Idaea osthelderi Wehrli, 1932
Idaea ostrinaria (Hübner, [1813])
Idaea pallidata ([Denis & Schiffermüller], 1775)
Idaea peluraria Reisser, 1939
Idaea politaria (Hübner, [1799])
Idaea proclivata Fuchs, 1902
Idaea roseofasciata Christoph, 1882
Idaea rufaria (Hübner, [1799])
Idaea ruficostata Zeller, 1847
Idaea rusticata ([Denis & Schiffermüller], 1775)
Idaea sericeata (Hübner, [1813])
Idaea serpentata (Hufnagel, 1767)
Idaea sodaliaria Herrich-Schäffer, [1852]
Idaea straminata Borkhausen, 1794
Idaea subpurpurata Staudinger, 1900
Idaea subsericeata Haworth, [1809]
Idaea sylvestraria (Hübner, [1799])
Idaea taurica Bang-Haas, 1907
Idaea textaria Lederer, 1861
Idaea tineata Thierry-Mieg, 1910
Idaea trigeminata Haworth, [1809]
Idaea troglodytaria Herrich-Schäffer, [1852]
Idaea vulpinaria Herrich-Schäffer, [1852]
Itame vincularia (Hübner, [1813])
Itame wauaria (Linnaeus, 1758)
Jodis lactearia (Linnaeus, 1758)
Kentrognophos ciscaucasicus Rjabov, 1964
Kentrognophos mardinarius Staudinger, 1901
Kentrognophos onustarius Herrich-Schäffer, [1852]
Kentrognophos zeitunarius Staudinger, 1901
Larentia clavaria Haworth, [1809]
Libanonia semitata Prout, 1913
Ligdia adustata (Fabricius, 1787)
Ligdia lassulata Rogenhofer, 1873
Lithostege ancyrana Prout, 1938
Lithostege bosphoraria Herrich-Schäffer, [1848]
Lithostege farinata (Hufnagel, 1767)
Lithostege griseata ([Denis & Schiffermüller], 1775)
Lithostege infuscata Eversmann, 1837
Lithostege odessaria Boisduval, 1848
Lithostege palaestinensis Amsel, 1935
Lithostege witzenmanni Standfuss, 1892
Lobophora halterata (Hufnagel, 1767)
Lomaspilis marginata (Linnaeus, 1758)
Lomaspilis opis Butler, 1879
Lomographa punctata (Fabricius, 1775)
Lycia graecaria Staudinger, 1861
Lycia hirtaria (Linnaeus, 1761)
Lycia pomonaria (Hübner, 1790)
Lycia zonaria ([Denis & Schiffermüller], 1775)
Lysognophos certhiatus Rebel, & Zerny, 1931
Lysognophos lividatus (Fabricius, 1787)
Lythria purpuraria (Linnaeus, 1758)
Lythria rotaria (Fabricius, 1798)
Melanthia procellata ([Denis & Schiffermüller], 1775)
Menophra abruptaria Thunberg, 1792
Menophra japygiaria Costa, 1849
Menophra trypanaria Wiltshire, 1948
Microloxia herbaria (Hübner, [1813])
Minoa murinata Scopoli, 1763
Myinodes interpunctaria Herrich-Schäffer, 1839
Narraga cappadocica Herbulot, 1943
Narraga fasciolaria (Hufnagel, 1767)
Nebula achromaria Harpe, 1852
Nebula apiciata Staudinger, 1892
Nebula approxiamata Staudinger, 1879
Nebula ludificata Lederer, 1870
Nebula reclamata Prout, 1914
Nebula salicata (Hübner, [1799])
Nebula senectaria Herrich-Schäffer, [1852]
Nebula vartianata Wiltshire, 1970
Neognopharmia stevenaria Boisduval, 1840
Neognophina pfeifferi Wehrli, 1926
Nychiodes obscuraria Villers, 1789
Nychiodes rayatica Wiltshire, 1957
Ochodontia adustaria Fischer de Waldheim, 1840
Odezia atrata (Linnaeus, 1758)
Odonthognophos zacharius Staudinger, 1879
Odontopera bidentata (Linnaeus, 1761)
Operophtera brumata (Linnaeus, 1758)
Operophtera fagata Scharfenberg, 1805
Opisthograptis luteolata (Linnaeus, 1758)
Opisthograptis niko Christoph, 1893
Organognophos wanensis Wehrli, 1936
Orthonama lignata (Hübner, [1799])
Orthonama opstipata (Fabricius, 1794)
Orthostixis calcularia Lederer, 1853
Orthostixis cribraria (Hübner, [1799])
Oulobophora externata Freyer, 1846
Oulobophora internata Püngeler, 1888
Ourapteryx malatyenis Wehrli, 1936
Ourapteryx persica Ménétriés, 1832
Ourapteryx sambucaria (Linnaeus, 1758)
Pachycnemia hippocastanaria (Hübner, [1799])
Pareulype berberata (Fabricius, 1787)
Pellonia vibicaria (Linnaeus, 1761)
Pelurga comitata (Linnaeus, 1758)
Pennithera firmata (Hübner, 1822)
Perconia strigillaria (Hübner, 1787)
Peribatodes correptarius Zeller, 1847
Peribatodes gemmaria Brahm, 1791
Peribatodes manuelaria Herrich-Schäffer, [1852]
Peribatodes perversarius Boisduval, 1840
Peribatodes secundarius (Esper, [1794])
Peribatodes syrilibanoni Wehrli, 1931
Peribatodes umbrarius (Hübner, [1809])
Perizoma albulatum ([Denis & Schiffermüller], 1775)
Perizoma alchemillatum (Linnaeus, 1758)
Perizoma blandiatum ([Denis & Schiffermüller], 1775)
Perizoma flavofasciatum Thunberg, 1792
Perizoma gigas Wiltshire, 1976
Perizoma parahydratum Alberti, 1969
Perizoma verberatum Scopoli, 1763
Petrophora chlorosata Scopoli, 1763
Petrophora narbonea (Linnaeus, 1767)
Phaselia serrularia Eversmann, 1847
Phibalapteryx virgata (Hufnagel, 1767)
Phigalia pedaria (Fabricius, 1787)
Philereme senescens Staudinger, 1892
Philereme transversata (Hufnagel, 1767)
Philereme vetulata ([Denis & Schiffermüller], 1775)
Phyllometra culminaria Eversmann, 1843
Plagodis dolabaria (Linnaeus, 1767)
Plemyria rubiginata ([Denis & Schiffermüller], 1775)
Problepsis ocellata Frivaldsky, 1845
Protorhoe corollaria Herrich-Schäffer, [1848]
Protorhoe renodata Püngeler, 1908
Protorhoe unicata Guenée, 1857
Proutictis artesiaria ([Denis & Schiffermüller], 1775)
Pseudopanthera macularia (Linnaeus, 1758)
Pseudopanthera syriacata Guenée, 1852
Pseudoterpna coronillaria (Hübner, [1817])
Pseudoterpna pruinata (Hufnagel, 1767)
Pungeleria capreolaria (Fabricius, 1787)
Pydna badiaria Freyer, [1841]
Rheumaptera hastata (Linnaeus, 1758)
Rheumaptera montivagata Duponchel, 1830
Rhodometra sacraria (Linnaeus, 1767)
Rhodostrophia calabra Petagna, 1786
Rhodostrophia jacularia (Hübner 1813)
Rhodostrophia sieversi Christoph, 1882
Rhodostrophia tabidaria Zeller, 1847
Rhoptria asperaria (Hübner, [1817])
Rhoptria dolosaria Herrich-Schäffer, [1848]
Rhoptria mardinata Staudinger, 1900
Schistostege nubilaria (Hübner, [1799])
Scopula beckeraria Lederer, 1853
Scopula decorata ([Denis & Schiffermüller], 1775)
Scopula drenowskii Sterneck, 1941
Scopula flaccidaria Zeller, 1852
Scopula imitaria (Hübner, [1799])
Scopula immistaria Herrich-Schäffer, [1852]
Scopula immorata (Linnaeus, 1758)
Scopula immutata (Linnaeus, 1758)
Scopula incanata (Linnaeus, 1758)
Scopula luridata Zeller, 1847
Scopula marginepunctata Goeze, 1781
Scopula nigropunctata (Hufnagel, 1767)
Scopula ochroleucaria Herrich-Schäffer, [1847]
Scopula orientalis Alphéraky, 1876
Scopula ornata Scopoli, 1763
Scopula pseudohonestata Wehrli,
Scopula rubiginata (Hufnagel, 1767)
Scopula submutata Treitschke, 1828
Scopula tessellaria Boisduval, 1840
Scopula transcaspica Prout, 1935
Scopula turbidaria (Hübner, [1819])
Scopula virgulata ([Denis & Schiffermüller], 1775)
Scotopteryx alpherakii Erschoff, 1877
Scotopteryx bipunctaria ([Denis & Schiffermüller], 1775)
Scotopteryx chenopodiata (Linnaeus, 1758)
Scotopteryx coarctaria ([Denis & Schiffermüller], 1775)
Scotopteryx langi Christoph, 1885
Scotopteryx luridata (Hufnagel, 1767)
Scotopteryx moeniata Scopoli, 1763
Scotopteryx mucronata Scopoli, 1763
Scotopteryx nebulata Bang-Haas, 1907
Scotopteryx octodurensis Favre, 1902
Scotopteryx vicinaria Duponchel, [1845]
Selenia dentaria (Fabricius, 1775)
Selenia lunularia (Hübner, 1788)
Selenia tetralunaria (Hufnagel, 1767)
Selidosema brunnearium Villers, 1789
Selidosema rorarium (Fabricius, 1777)
Semiothisa aestimaria (Hübner, [1809])
Semiothisa alternata ([Denis & Schiffermüller], 1775)
Semiothisa clathrata (Linnaeus, 1758)
Semiothisa glarearia Brahm, 1791
Semiothisa liturata (Linnaeus, 1761)
Semiothisa notata (Linnaeus, 1758)
Semiothisa rippertaria Duponchel, 1830
Semiothisa signaria (Hübner, [1809])
Semiothisa syriacaria Staudinger, 1871
Serraca punctinalis Scopoli, 1763
Siona lineata Scopoli, 1763
Stamnodes depeculata Lederer, 1870
Stegania dalmataria Guenée, 1857
Stegania dilectaria (Hübner, 1790)
Stegania trimaculata Villers, 1789
Stueningia poggearia Lederer, 1855
Stueningia wolfi Hausmann, 1993
Synopsia sociaria (Hübner, [1799])
Tephrina arenacearia ([Denis & Schiffermüller], 1775)
Tephrina hopfferaria Staudinger, 1879
Tephrina inconspicuaria (Hübner, [1817])
Tephrina murinaria ([Denis & Schiffermüller], 1775)
Tephronia sepiaria (Hufnagel, 1767)
Thalera fimbrialis Scopoli, 1763
Thera britannica Turner, 1925
Thera cognata Thunberg, 1792
Thera cupressata Freyer, [1830]
Thera juniperata (Linnaeus, 1758)
Thera obeliscata (Hübner, 1787)
Thera variata ([Denis & Schiffermüller], 1775)
Therapis flavicaria ([Denis & Schiffermüller], 1775)
Theria rupicapraria ([Denis & Schiffermüller], 1775)
Thetidia volgaria Guenée, 1857
Timandra griseata Petersen 1902
Trichodezia haberhaueri Lederer, 1864
Triphosa agnata Cerf, 1918
Triphosa dubitata (Linnaeus, 1758)
Triphosa sabaudiata Duponchel, 1830
Triphosa taochata Lederer, 1870
Warneckeella malatyana Wehrli, 1934
Wehrliola revocaria Staudinger, 1892
Xanthorhoe biriviata Borkhausen, 1794
Xanthorhoe designata (Hufnagel, 1767)
Xanthorhoe ferrugata Clerck, 1759
Xanthorhoe fluctuata (Linnaeus, 1758)
Xanthorhoe inconsiderata Staudinger, 1892
Xanthorhoe montanata ([Denis & Schiffermüller], 1775)
Xanthorhoe munitata (Hübner, [1809])
Xanthorhoe oxybiata Millire, 1872
Xanthorhoe quadrifasciaria (Linnaeus, 1761)
Xanthorhoe rectifasciaria Lederer, 1853
Xenochlorodes beryllaria Mann, 1853
Xenochlorodes olympiaria Herrich-Schäffer, [1852]
unplaced auctata Staudinger, 1879

Cimeliidae
Axia olga Staudinger, 1900
Axia theresiae Korb, 1900

Drepanidae
Cilix asiatica Bang-Haas, 1907
Cilix glaucata Scopoli, 1763
Drepana falcataria (Linnaeus, 1758)
Watsonalla binaria (Hufnagel, 1767)
Watsonalla cultraria (Fabricius, 1775)
Watsonalla uncinula Borkhausen, 1790

Thyatiridae
Cymatophorina diluta ([Denis & Schiffermüller], 1775)
Habrosyne pyritoides (Hufnagel, 1766)
Polyploca korbi Rebel, 1901
Polyploca ruficollis (Fabricius, 1787)
Tethea ocularis (Linnaeus, 1767)
Tethea or ([Denis & Schiffermüller], 1775)
Thyatira batis (Linnaeus, 1758)
Thyatira hedemanni Christoph, 1885

Sphingidae
Acherontia atropos (Linnaeus, 1758)
Agrius convolvuli (Linnaeus, 1758)
Akbesia davidi Oberthür, 1884
Clarina kotschyi Kollar, [1849]
Daphnis nerii (Linnaeus, 1758)
Deilephila elpenor (Linnaeus, 1758)
Deilephila porcellus (Linnaeus, 1758)
Deilephila suellus Staudinger, 1878
Dolbina elegans A.Bang-Haas, 1927
Hemaris croatica (Esper, [1779])
Hemaris dentata Staudinger, 1887
Hemaris fuciformis (Linnaeus, 1758)
Hemaris tityus (Linnaeus, 1758)
Hippotion celerio (Linnaeus, 1758)
Hyles centralasiae Staudinger, 1887
Hyles euphorbiae (Linnaeus, 1758)
Hyles gallii (Rottemburg, 1775)
Hyles hippophaes (Esper, [1789])
Hyles livornica (Esper, [1779])
Hyles nicaea Prunner, 1798
Hyles vespertilio (Esper, [1779])
Hyles zygophylli
Hyloicus pinastri (Linnaeus, 1758)
Hyloicus Hübner, [1819]
Laothoe populi (Linnaeus, 1758)
Macroglossum stellatarum (Linnaeus, 1758)
Marumba quercus ([Denis & Schiffermüller], 1775)
Mimas tiliae (Linnaeus, 1758)
Proserpinus proserpinus Pallas, 1772
Rethera brandti O.Bang-Haas, 1937
Rethera komarovi Christoph, 1885
Smerinthus kindermannii Lederer, 1852
Smerinthus ocellatus (Linnaeus, 1758)
Sphingaenopiopsis gorgoniades (Hübner, [1819])
Sphinx ligustri (Linnaeus, 1758)
Theretra alecto (Linnaeus, 1758)

Notodontidae
Cerura intermedia Teich, 1896
Cerura vinula (Linnaeus, 1758)
Clostera anachoreta (Fabricius, 1787)
Clostera curtula (Linnaeus, 1758)
Clostera pigra (Hufnagel, 1766)
Dicranura ulmi ([Denis & Schiffermüller], 1775)
Drymonia dodonaea ([Denis & Schiffermüller], 1775)
Drymonia querna (Fabricius, 1787)
Drymonia ruficornis (Hufnagel, 1766)
Eligmodonta ziczac (Linnaeus, 1758)
Furcula bicuspis Borkhausen, 1790
Furcula bifida Brahm, 1787
Furcula furcula (Linnaeus, 1761)
Furcula interrupta Christoph, 1867
Furcula syra Grum-Grshimailo, 1899
Harpyia milhauseri (Fabricius, 1775)
Neoharpyia pulcherrima Brandt, 1938
Notodonta dromedarius (Linnaeus, 1767)
Ochrostigma melagona (Hufnagel, 1766)
Ochrostigma velitaris (Hufnagel, 1766)
Paradrymonia vittata Staudinger, 1892
Peridea anceps Goeze, 1781
Peridea korbi Rebel, 1918
Phalera bucephala (Linnaeus, 1758)
Phalera bucephaloides Ochsenheimer, 1810
Pheosia tremula (Linnaeus, 1761)
Pterostoma palpina (Linnaeus, 1761)
Ptilodon capucina (Linnaeus, 1758)
Ptilodontella cucullina ([Denis & Schiffermüller], 1775)
Ptilodontella saerdabensis Daniel, 1938
Rhegmatophila alpina Bellier, 1881
Spatalia argentina ([Denis & Schiffermüller], 1775)
Stauropus fagi (Linnaeus, 1758)
Tritopha tritopha ([Denis & Schiffermüller], 1775)

Thaumetopoeidae
Thaumetopoea processionea (Linnaeus, 1758)
Thaumetopoea solitaria Freyer, [1838]
Traumatocampa pinivora Treitschke, 1834
Traumatocampa pityocampa ([Denis & Schiffermüller], 1775)
Traumatocampa wilkinsoni Tams, 1925

Lymantriidae
Arctornis l-nigrum (Müller, 1764)
Clethrogyna dubia Tauscher, 1806
Dicallomera fascelina (Linnaeus, 1758)
Elkneria pudibunda (Linnaeus, 1758)
Euproctis chrysorrhoea (Linnaeus, 1758)
Laelia coenosa (Hübner, [1808])
Leucoma salicis (Linnaeus, 1758)
Lymantria destituta Staudinger, 1892
Lymantria dispar (Linnaeus, 1758)
Lymantria lapidicola Herrich-Schäffer, 1852
Lymantria monacha (Linnaeus, 1758)
Ocneria detrita (Esper, [1785])
Ocneria raddei Christoph, 1885
Ocneria samarita Staudinger, 1895
Ocneria terebinthi Freyer, [1838]
Ocneria terebynthina Staudinger, 1894
Ocnerogyna amanda Staudinger, 1892
Orgyia antiqua (Linnaeus, 1758)
Orgyia trigotephras Boisduval, 1829
Sphrageidus melania Staudinger, 1891
Sphrageidus similis (Fuessly, 1775)

Arctiidae
Ammobiota festiva (Hufnagel, 1766)
Arctia caja (Linnaeus, 1758)
Atolmis rubricollis (Linnaeus, 1758)
Axiopoena maura Eichwald, 1830
Callimorpha dominula (Linnaeus, 1758)
Chelis maculosa Gerning, 1780
Conjuncta conjuncta Staudinger, 1892
Coscinia cribraria (Linnaeus, 1758)
Cybosia mesomella (Linnaeus, 1758)
Cymbalophora rivularis Ménétriés, 1832
Diacrisia sannio (Linnaeus, 1758)
Diaphora mendica (Linnaeus, 1761)
Eilema caniola (Hübner, [1808])
Eilema complana (Linnaeus, 1758)
Eilema costalis Zeller, 1847
Eilema griseola (Hübner, [1802])
Eilema lurideola Zincken, 1817
Eilema lutarella (Linnaeus, 1758)
Eilema palliatella Scopoli, 1763
Eilema pseudocomplana Daniel, 1939
Eilema pygmaeola Doubleday, 1847
Epatalmis caesarea Goeze, 1781
Epicallia villica (Linnaeus, 1758)
Euplagia quadripunctaria (Linnaeus, 1761)
Euplagia splendidior Tams, 1922
Hyphantria cunea Drury, 1773
Hyphoraia aulica (Linnaeus, 1758)
Katha deplana (Esper, [1787])
Lacydes spectabilis Tauscher, 1806
Lithosia quadra (Linnaeus, 1758)
Maurica bellieri Lederer, 1855
Miltochrista miniata Forster, 1771
Muscula muscula Staudinger, 1899
Nebrarctia semiramis Staudinger, 1892
Nudaria mundana (Linnaeus, 1761)
Ocnogyna anatolica Witt, 1980
Ocnogyna herrichi Staudinger, 1879
Ocnogyna loewii Zeller, 1846
Ocnogyna parasita (Hübner, 1790)
Paidia albescens Staudinger, 1892
Paidia cinerascens Herrich-Schäffer, [1847]
Paidia rica Freyer, [1855]
Parasemia plantaginis (Linnaeus, 1758)
Pelosia muscerda (Hufnagel, 1766)
Pelosia obtusa Herrich-Schäffer, [1847]
Phragmatobia fuliginosa (Linnaeus, 1758)
Phragmatobia placida Frivaldsky, 1835
Rhyparia purpurata (Linnaeus, 1758)
Setina aurata Ménétriés, 1832
Setina roscida ([Denis & Schiffermüller], 1775)
Spilosoma lubricipeda (Linnaeus, 1758)
Spilosoma luteum (Hufnagel, 1766)
Spilosoma urticae (Esper, [1789])
Spiris striata (Linnaeus, 1758)
Thumatha senex (Hübner, [1808])
Tyria jacobaeae (Linnaeus, 1758)
Utetheisa pulchella (Linnaeus, 1758)
Watsonarctia deserta Bartel, 1902
Wittia sororcula (Hufnagel, 1766)

Ctenuchidae
Amata aequipuncta Turati, 1917
Amata antiochena Lederer, 1861
Amata banghaasi Obraztsov, 1966
Amata caspica Staudinger, 1877
Amata hakkariana Freina, 1982
Amata phegea (Linnaeus, 1758)
Amata rossica Turati, 1917
Amata sintenisi Standfuss, 1892
Amata tanina Freina, 1982
Amata taurica Turati, 1917
Amata transcaspica Obraztsov, 1941
Amata wiltshirei Bytinski-Salz, 1939
Callitomis dimorpha Bytinski-Salz, 1939
Dysauxes ancilla (Linnaeus, 1767)
Dysauxes famula Freyer, 1836
Dysauxes punctata (Fabricius, 1781)
Dysauxes syntomida Staudinger, 1892

Noctuidae
About 1085 species - see: List of moths of Turkey (Noctuidae)

External links
Tentative Checklist of the Turkish Lepidoptera part 1
Tentative Checklist of the Turkish Lepidoptera part 2
Tentative Checklist of the Turkish Lepidoptera part 3
Fauna Europaea (European part of Turkey)

Turkey
Moths
Moths